= Members of the Royal Netherlands Academy of Arts and Sciences (S) =

The Royal Netherlands Academy of Arts and Sciences (Dutch: Koninklijke Nederlandse Akademie van Wetenschappen, abbreviated: KNAW) is an organization dedicated to the advancement of science and literature in the Netherlands. The academy is housed in the Trippenhuis in Amsterdam. Founded in 1808, members are appointed for life by co-optation.

== List of members (S) ==
Name	Type	Division	Date of election	Notes	Ref.
P. Sabatier					
J. von Sachs					
Wolfgang Max Hugo Sachtler					
Antoine-Isaac Silvestre de Sacy					
R. de la Sagra y Peris					
J.J. Salverda de Grave					
Hendricus Gerardus van de Sande Bakhuyzen					
Ernst Frederik van de Sande Bakhuyzen					
W.H. van de Sande Bakhuyzen					
C.M. van der Sande Lacoste					
Gerardus Sandifort					
J.N. Sane					
M.F. de Santarete de Barros e Saura					
Abraham Jacob Saportas					
Ferdinand Leon Rudolphe Sassen					
N.T. de Saussure					
Pieter Joseph Sauvage					
J.G. Sauveplanne					
F.C. von Savigny					
A.F. de Savornin Lohman					
J. Schacht					
Jan Scharp					
Berta V. Scharrer					
Gottfried Schatz					
Ch.A.H. Schefer					
F.E.C. Scheffer					
A. Scheffer					
R.H.C.C. Scheffer					
A. Schelfhout					
C.J. van Schelle					
Jacobus Scheltema					
H.J. Scheltema					
J.H.G. Schepers					
J.M.J. Schepper					
W. Schermerhorn					
Mrs. Annemarie Schimmel					
G. Schlegel					
Herman Schlegel					
P.C. Schmerling					
George Adam Schmidt					
Willem Hendrik Schmidt					
F. Schmidt Degener					
Ivo Schöffer					
G.G. Scholem					
Charles Mathieu Schols					
Paul Scholten					
J.H. Scholten					
M. Schönfeld					
Hermanus Cornelis Franciscus Schoordijk					
L. von Schorn					
Johannes Christiaan Schotel					
Gilles Dionysius Jacobus Schotel					
Martinus Schouman					
Pieter Hendrik Schoute					
J.C. Schoute					
Dirk Bernard Joseph Schouten					
J.F. Schouten					
Jan Arnoldus Schouten					
H.A. Schrader					
Joannes Matthias Schrant					
F.A.H. Schreinemakers					
B.J.O. Schrieke					
J.C.F.H. Schrijnen					
Johan Christian Schröder					
Johannes Frederik Lodewijk Schröder					
R.C.H. Schröder					
J.H. Schröder					
Jacobus Schroeder van der Kolk					
Jacobus Lodewijk Conradus Schroeder van der Kolk					
H. Schuchardt					
W.A.P. Schüffner					
K.J. Schuhmann					
G.C.A. Schuit					
J. W. Schulte Nordholt					
H. Schulte Nordholt					
M. Schwarzschild					
D.H. Scott					
A.A. Sebastian					
H.G. Seelig					
I.L. Seeligmann					
U.J. Seetzen					
E. Selenka					
A. van Selms					
E. Senart					
J. Senebier					
Johannes C. (Hans) Sens					
Jean Ferdinand Sentelet					
C.P. Serrure					
Jacob Frederik Serrurier					
P. Serton					
A.J.J. Severyns					
Nicholas John Shackleton					
C.E. Shannon					
G.R. Sharp					
E.A. Sharpey-Schafer					
C.S. Sherrington					
Mattias Siegenbeek					
W. Sierpinski					
Ed. Sievers					
Barend Sijmons					
P.J. Sijpesteijn					
Jerome Alexander Sillem					
A.I. Silvestre de Sacy					
Gerrit Simons					
Adam Simons					
Diederik Johan Singendonck					
Lamoraal Ulbo de Sitter					
Willem de Sitter (2)					
Jan Six					
J.P. Six					
Hendrik Six van Hillegom					
Marie S. Sklodowska, sp/o Curie					
Edward Charles Slater					
B.H. Slicher van Bath					
S.R. Slings					
L.A.J.W. Sloet van de Beele					
E. van Slogteren					
Jan Otto Sluiter					
Carel Philip Sluiter					
Nicolaas Smallenburg					
A.A. Smijers					
Jacobus Wilhelmus Smit					
H. (Hans) Smit					
W.A.P. Smit					
J. (Jacob) Smit					
Isidore Snapper					
F.A. Snellaert					
Samuel Constantinus Snellen van Vollenhoven					
Z.W. Sneller					
C. Snouck Hurgronje					
F.H. Sobels					
Cornelis Soetermeer					
Friedrich H.R. Solmsen					
Reijer Hendrik van Someren					
W.H. Somermeyer					
Samuel Thomas von Sömmering					
A.M. Sorg					
A.L. Sötemann					
Robert Southey					
Thomas Richard Edmund Southwood					
Willem Anne van Spaen la Lecq					
H.A. Spandaw					
H. Spekreijse					
J.S. Speyer					
Simon Speyert van der Eyk					
Ludwig T. von Spittler					
L. Spohr					
Kurt Polycarp Joachim Sprengel					
Tonny Albert Springer					
Charles Henri Hubert Spronck					
Johan Frederik ('Frits') Staal					
Frans Antonie Stafleu					
Gerold Stahel					
Franciscus Johannes Stamkart					
R.Y. Stanier					
Antonie Christiaan Wynand Staring, van den Wildenborch					
Wijnand Carel Hugo Staring					
Hendrik Gerard Stassen					
C.G.G.J. van Steenis					
J. Steenmeijer					
Jan Steenwinkel					
M.A. Stein					
J.W.J.A. Stein					
P.V. van Stein Callenfels					
T.A. (Theo) Stevers					
Thomas Jan Stieltjes, Sr					
Thomas Jan Stieltjes, Jr.					
A. van Stipriaan Luïscius					
Th.C. van Stockum					
J.P. van der Stok					
Barend Joseph Stokvis					
J. (Julius) Stone					
H.F. von Storch					
D.J. Storm Buysing					
W. Storm van Leeuwen					
Marcel Leon Louis Victor Storme					
Lambertus Marius Joannes Ursinus van Straaten					
Charles van der Straeten					
Ed. Strasburger					
Adam Anthony Stratenus					
Sibrandus Stratingh, Ez					
Jacobus Albertus Streso					
Bruno Hugo Stricker					
Jacob van Strij					
Abraham van Strij (1)					
B.G.D. Strömgren					
Dirk J. Struik					
Lord Rayleigh Strutt, J.W.					
O.W. von Struve					
O. Struve					
A.A.H. Struycken					
H.J.L. Struycken					
M. Stuart					
W. Studemund					
J.H. Stuffken					
F.L.H.M. Stumpers					
R. Stupperich					
W.F. Stutterheim					
C.F.P. Stutterheim					
Pierre Jean Suremont					
Gerard Tjaard Suringar					
Willem Frederik Reinier Suringar					
J. Sutton					
J.Ph. Suyling					
T.F. Suys					
Jöns Svanberg					
Willem Simon Swart					
K.W. Swart					
B.A. Swart					
C. Swaving					
N.H. Swellengrebel					
Jan Hendrik van Swinden					
Theodorus van Swinderen					
H. von Sybel					
C.A. van Sypesteyn (2)					

=== Living members ===
Name	Type	Division	Date of election	Notes	Ref.
Wim van Saarloos	Member				
Richard van de Sanden	Member				
Andries Sanders	Member				
Rutger van Santen	Member				
Pasqualina Sarro	Member				
George Sawatzky	Member				
Thilo C. Schadeberg	Member				
Peer Scheepers	Member				
Marten Scheffer	Member				
Rob Scheller	Member				
Michiel Scheltema	Member				
Philip Scheltens	Member				
Riet Schenkeveld-van der Dussen	Member				
Ben Scheres	Member				
Rik Schipper	Member				
Louis Schoonhoven	Member				
Herman Schoordijk	Member				
Johan Schot	Member				
Kees Schouhamer Immink	Member				
Stefan Schouten	Member				
Daan Schram	Member				
Lex Schrijver	Member				
Nico Schrijver	Member				
Piet Schrijvers	Member				
Kees Schuyt	Member				
Jaap Seidell	Member				
Pieter Seuren	Member				
Carla Sieburgh	Member				
Rolf Siemssen	Member				
Jonathan Silk	Member				
Maarten Simoons	Member				
Jaap Sinninghe Damsté	Member				
Jan Sixma	Member				
Titia Sixma	Member				
Ineke Sluiter	Member				
Jan Smit	Member				
Jan Smits	Member				
Wouter Snijders	Member				
Gordon Snow	Member				
Arthur van Soest	Member				
Luc Soete	Member				
Arend Soeteman	Member				
Thomas Spijkerboer	Member				
Jop Spruit	Member				
Ton van der Steen	Member				
Linda Steg	Member				
Ewout Steyerberg	Member				
Martin Stokhof	Member				
Marten Stol	Member				
Ad Stouthamer	Member				
Wim van Swaaij	Member				
Abram de Swaan	Member				
Jakob de Swaan Arons	Member				
Henriëtte de Swart	Member				
Pauline Schaap	Corresponding Member				
Carel van Schaik	Corresponding Member				
Anton Schep	Corresponding Member				
Alex Schmid	Corresponding Member				
Maarten Schmidt	Corresponding Member				
jan Sengers	Corresponding Member				
W. Siebrand	Corresponding Member				
Boudewijn Sirks	Corresponding Member				
Paul Smith	Corresponding Member				
Roel Snieder	Corresponding Member				
Tom Snijders	Corresponding Member				
Otto Strack	Corresponding Member				
Sebastian van Strien	Corresponding Member				
Heinz Schilling	Foreign Member				
P. Schmid	Foreign Member				
Walter Schmitz	Foreign Member				
Albrecht Schöne	Foreign Member				
Giacinto Scoles	Foreign Member				
Joachim Seelig	Foreign Member				
Jean-Pierre Serre	Foreign Member				
Isaac Silvera	Foreign Member				
Carlos Steel	Foreign Member				
Keith Stenning	Foreign Member				
Karl Stetter	Foreign Member				
J. F. Stoddart	Foreign Member				
Michael Stone	Foreign Member				
Takashi Sugimura	Foreign Member				
Rashid Sunyaev	Foreign Member				
