= List of people on the postage stamps of the Netherlands =

This article lists people who have been featured on the postage stamps of the Netherlands. Note that many of these people have been featured on multiple stamps. The following entries list the name of the person, a short description of their notability, and the first year they were first featured on a stamp.

This list is complete up to 2021.

== A ==
- Afrojack, disk jockey (2014)
- Princess Alexia of the Netherlands, second daughter of King Willem-Alexander (2012)
- Princess Ariane of the Netherlands, third daughter of King Willem-Alexander (2012)
- Anthony van Assche, gymnast (2009)
- Tobias Michael Carel Asser, jurist and Nobel prize winner (1991)

== B ==
- Willem Barents, explorer (1996)
- Beatrix of the Netherlands, queen of the Netherlands, 1980-2013 (1946, 1980, 1981-6, 1990, 1991-5, 2001)
- Nicolaas Beets, theologian & writer (1939)
- Lobke Berkhout, mentor of Maureen Groefsema (2009)
- Hendrik Petrus Berlage, architect (1954)
- Dash Berlin, disk jockey (2014)
- Prince Bernhard of the Netherlands, prince consort (1971, 1987)
- Willem Jansz Blaeu, cartographer (1983)
- Herman Boerhaave, physician (1928, 1938)
- Godfried Bomans, writer (2013)
- Mark van Bommel, Dutch soccer player (2006)
- Saint Boniface, missionary (1954)
- Johannes Bosboom, painter (1941)
- Boudewijn of Belgium, king (1964)
- Khalid Boulahrouz, Dutch soccer player (2006)
- Louis Braille, inventor (1975)
- Giovanni van Bronckhorst, Dutch soccer player (2006)
- L. E. J. Brouwer, Dutch mathematician and philosopher (2007)
- Armin van Buuren, disk jockey (2014)

== C ==
- Petrus Camper, anatomist (1940)
- Simon Carmiggelt, writer (2013)
- Romeo Castelen, Dutch soccer player (2006)
- Catharina-Amalia, Princess of Orange, first daughter of King Willem-Alexander (2003)
- Charles V, Holy Roman Emperor, Holy Roman Emperor (2000)
- Charlotte of Luxembourg, Grand Duchess of Luxembourg (1964)
- Winston Churchill, politician (1980)
- Claus von Amsberg, prince and husband of Queen Beatrix (1991)
- Phillip Cocu, Dutch soccer player (2006)
- Christopher Columbus, explorer (1992)
- Leon Commandeur, cyclist (2009)
- Prince Constantijn of the Netherlands, younger brother of Willem-Alexander (1972)
- Louis Couperus, writer (2013)

== D ==
- Peter J. W. Debye, chemist and Nobel prize winner (1995)
- Aagje Deken, writer (1941)
- Eduard Douwes Dekker, writer (1987)
- Hendrik van Deventer, physician (1947)
- Alphons Diepenbrock, composer (1935)
- Sjoukje Dijkstra, figure skater (2012)
- Franciscus Donders, ophthalmologist (1935)
- Janus Dousa, historian (1950)
- Cornelis Drebbel, submarine inventor (2010)
- Willem Drees, statesman (1986)
- Frans Adam van der Duyn van Maasdam, Dutch officer and politician (1963)

== E ==
- Christiaan Eijkman, physician and Nobel prize winner (1993)
- Willem Einthoven, physician and Nobel prize winner (1993)
- Urby Emanuelson, Dutch soccer player (2006)
- Emma of Waldeck and Pyrmont, queen regent of the Netherlands, 1879-90 (1927, 1934, 1990)
- Erasmus, humanist (1936, 1969, 1988)
- M. C. Escher, graphic artist (1998)
- Cornelis Evertsen, naval hero (1943)
- Cornelis Evertsen de Jongste, naval hero (1943)
- Johan Evertsen, naval hero (1943)

== F ==
- Anne Frank, diarist and Holocaust victim (1980)
- Johan Friso, brother of King Willem-Alexander (1972)

== G ==
- Yvonne van Gennip, Olympic gold medal winner for speed skating (2006)
- Willem van Ghent, naval hero (1943)
- Anton Geesink, judoka (2012)
- Vincent van Gogh, painter (1940, 1954, 1990)
- Bas van de Goor, volleyball player (2009)
- Maureen Groefsema, judoist (2009)
- Guillaume Groen van Prinsterer, politician (1976)
- Anneke Grönloh, singer (2012)
- Hugo de Groot, jurist, poet and playwright (1947, 1983)
- Anky van Grunsven, dressage (2012)
- Henri Daniel Guyot, educator (1935)

== H ==
- Hella Haasse, writer (2012)
- Hardwell, disk jockey (2014)
- Herman Heijermans, Dutch writer (1974)
- Piet Hein, naval hero (1943)
- Ottho Gerhard Heldring, writer (1938)
- Hendrik of Mecklenburg-Schwerin, prince (1927)
- Jacobus Henricus van 't Hoff, chemist (1991)
- Gijsbert Karel van Hogendorp, statesman (1963)
- Adriaan Roland Holst, writer (2013)
- Pieter Cornelisz Hooft, poet & historian (1947)
- Jan Thomassen à Thuessink van der Hoop, aviator (1928)
- Jan van Hout, writer & secretary (1950)
- Cornelis de Houtman, explorer (1996)
- Johan Huizinga, historian (1954)
- Christiaan Huygens, polymath (1928)
- Constantijn Huygens, poet, father of Christiaan Huygens (1987)
- Constantijn Huygens, Jr., brother of Christiaan Huygens (1955)
- Philips Huygens, brother of Christiaan Huygens (1955)

== I ==
- Jan Ingenhousz, physician & botanist (1941)
- Princess Irene of the Netherlands, princess (1946)
- Joris Ivens, film maker (1995)

== J ==
- Eduard Jacobs, cabaret performer (1995)
- Nigel de Jong, Dutch soccer player (2006)
- Tonny de Jong, speed skater (2009)
- Freek de Jonge, cabaret performer (1995)
- Juliana of the Netherlands, queen of the Netherlands (1934, 1948, 1953, 1954, 1969, 1973, 1979, 1987, 1990)

== K ==
- Wim Kan, cabaret performer (1995)
- Johan Kenkhuis, mentor of Leon Commandeur (2009)
- Marko Koers, mentor of Aniek van Koot (2009)
- Aniek van Koot, wheelchair tennis player (2009)
- George Alexander Koppen, aviator (1928)
- Gerrit Kouwenaar, writer (2013)
- Doutzen Kroes, Dutch supermodel and actress (2016)
- Abraham Kuyper, politician and founder of the Free University (1980)
- Dirk Kuyt, Dutch soccer player (2006)

== L ==
- Denny Landzaat, Dutch soccer player (2006)
- Ellen van Langen, runner (2012)
- Trijn van Leemput, heroine in the Eighty Years’ War (2013)
- Antonie van Leeuwenhoek, scientist (1937)
- Judith Leyster, painter (1999)
- Leopold Karel, Count of Limburg Stirum, politician (1963)
- Willem van Loon, merchant (1955)
- Hendrik Lorentz, physicist (1928)

== M ==
- Hedwiges Maduro, Dutch soccer player (2006)
- Gustav Mahler, composer (1995)
- Jacques Mahu, explorer (1996)
- Nelson Mandela, president of South Africa (2005)
- Margaret of Austria, Duchess of Savoy, aunt and guardian of Charles V (2000)
- Margaret of Parma, daughter of Charles V (2000)
- Princess Margriet of the Netherlands, third daughter of Queen Juliana and Prince Bernhard (1946)
- Jacob Maris, painter (1937)
- Matthijs Maris, painter (1939)
- Mike Marissen, swimmer (2009)
- Philips of Marnix, lord of Sint-Aldegonde, writer (1938)
- Mary of Burgundy, Duchess of Burgundy (2013)
- Antonius Mathijsen, physician (1941)
- Joris Mathijsen, Dutch soccer player (2006)
- Anton Mauve, painter (1939)
- Máxima Zorreguieta Cerruti, queen of the Netherlands (2002)
- Eduard Meijers, jurist (1970)
- Jan Pieter Minckeleers, physicist (1928)
- Wolfgang Amadeus Mozart, composer (2016)
- Petrus van Musschenbroek, professor of mathematics and philosophy (2011)

== N ==
- Martinus Nijhoff, poet (1954)
- Ruud van Nistelrooy, Dutch soccer player (2006)

== O ==
- Johan van Oldenbarneveldt, statesman (1983)
- Heike Kamerlingh Onnes, physicist (1936)
- Maria van Oosterwijck, painter (2013)
- Barry Opdam, Dutch soccer player (2006)
- Gentaku Otsuki, Japanese expert on the Dutch (2014)
- Pieter Jacobus Oud, politician (1980)

== P ==
- Robin van Persie, Dutch soccer player (2006)
- Gerard Philips, industrialist (1991)
- Willem Pijper, composer (1954)
- Jean-Louis Pisuisse, cabaret performer (1995)
- Petrus Plancius, cartographer (1996)
- Albert Plesman, aviator (1954)
- Ids Postma, speed skater (2009)
- Everhardus Johannes Potgieter, poet (1940)
- Elvis Presley, American singer (2006)

== Q ==
There are no persons in this list whose surname begins with “Q”.

== R ==
- Rembrandt van Rijn, painter (1930, 1938, 1955, 1999)
- Jan van Riebeeck, colonial administrator (1952)
- Nico Rienks, rower (2012)
- Titus van Rijn, son of Rembrandt van Rijn (1941)
- Rintje Ritsma, speed skater (2009)
- Arjen Robben, Dutch soccer player (2006)
- Tjalie Robinson, writer (2012)
- Gianni Romme, speed skater (2009)
- J.F. van Royen, head of the postal services (1947)
- Michiel de Ruyter, naval hero (1907, 1943, 1957, 1976)

== S ==
- Edwin van der Sar, Dutch soccer player (2006)
- Nicolien Sauerbreij, snowboarder (2012)
- Alexander de Savornin Lohman, politician (1980)
- Joseph Justus Scaliger, scholar (1940)
- Herman Schaepman, politician (1936)
- Ard Schenk, Olympic gold medal winner for speed skating (2006)
- Charles Prosper Wolff Schoemaker, architect (2012)
- Jacobus Schroeder van der Kolk, physician (1960)
- Franz Schubert, composer (1997)
- Anna Maria van Schurman, Dutch painter, engraver, poet, and scholar (1978)
- Albert Schweitzer, theologian & physician (1975)
- Saint Servatius, bishop (1984)
- Philipp Franz van Siebold, physician in Japan (2014)
- Wesley Sneijder, Dutch soccer player (2006)
- Baruch Spinoza, philosopher (1977)
- nl:Anthony Christiaan Winand Staring, poet (1941)
- Jan Steen, painter (1940, 1979)
- Pieter Stuyvesant, governor (1939)
- Jan Pieterszoon Sweelinck, composer (1935)
- Gerard van Swieten, physician (1939)
- Franciscus Sylvius, physician & scientist (1937)

== T ==
- Gerard 't Hooft, Nobel Physics laureate (2011)
- Aritius Sybrandus Talma, politician (1936)
- Johan Rudolf Thorbecke, politician (1998)
- Andy Tielman, musician (2012)
- Tiësto, disk jockey (2014)
- Henk Timmer, Dutch soccer player (2006)
- Jan Tinbergen, economist and Nobel prize winner (1995)
- Alexandrine Tinne, explorer of the Sahara region (2013)
- Pieter Jelles Troelstra, politician (1980)
- Cornelis Tromp, naval hero (1943)
- Maarten Tromp, naval hero (1943)
- Mark Tuitert, speed skater (2009)

== U ==
- Saskia van Uylenburch, Rembrandt’s wife (1983)
- Jochem Uytdehaage, speed skater (2009)

== V ==
- Rafael van der Vaart, Dutch soccer player (2006)
- Bart Veldkamp, speed skater (2009)
- Esther Vergeer, Paralympian tennis player (2012)
- Eduard Rutger Verkade, stage actor (1978)
- Jan Vennegoor of Hesselink, Dutch soccer player (2006)
- Simon Vestdijk, writer (1998)
- Maria Tesselschade Visscher, poet (1938)
- Ron Vlaar, Dutch soccer player (2006)
- Gisbertus Voetius, theologian (1936)
- Joost van den Vondel, poet (1937, 1979)
- Tjerk de Vries, naval hero (1943)

== W ==
- Johannes Diderik van der Waals, physicist and Nobel prize winner (1993)
- Maarten van der Weijden, swimmer (2012)
- Johannes Wier, physician (1960)
- Wilhelmina of the Netherlands, queen of the Netherlands, 1890-1948 (1891, 1898, 1913, 1923, 1926-7, 1931, 1934, 1939, 1944, 1947-8, 1980, 1990, 1998)
- Willem-Alexander of the Netherlands, king of the Netherlands, 2013- (2002)
- William the Silent, revolutionary leader (1933, 1984)
- William I of the Netherlands, king of the Netherlands, 1815-40 (1913)
- William II of the Netherlands, king of the Netherlands, 1840-49 (1913)
- William III of the Netherlands, king of the Netherlands, 1849-90 (1852, 1867, 1872, 1913, 1927)
- Saint Willibrord, missionary (1939)
- Witte de With, naval hero (1943)
- Johan de Witt, politician (1947)

== X ==
There are no persons in this list whose surname begins with “X”.

== Y ==
There are no persons in this list whose surname begins with “Y”.

== Z ==
- Falko Zandstra, speed skater (2009)
- Pieter Zeeman, physicist (1991)
- Anna Zernike, theologian and first female minister in the Netherlands (2013)
- Frits Zernike, physicist and Nobel prize winner (1995)
- Leontien Zijlaard-van Moorsel, cyclist (2012)
- Belle van Zuylen, writer (2013)

== Sources ==
- 2021 Scott Standard Postage Stamp Catalogue, Vol. 5A, ©2020, Amos Media Co., Sidney, OH
- Michel Europa Katalog Band 6 Westeuropa 2006/2007, ©2006, Schwaneberger Verlag GMBH, Munich, Germany
- NVPH Speciale catalogus 2003, Postzegels van Nederland en overzeese rijksdelen, ©2002, NVPH, s’Gravenhage, Netherlands
