= Philip Scheltens =

Dutch professor of neurology

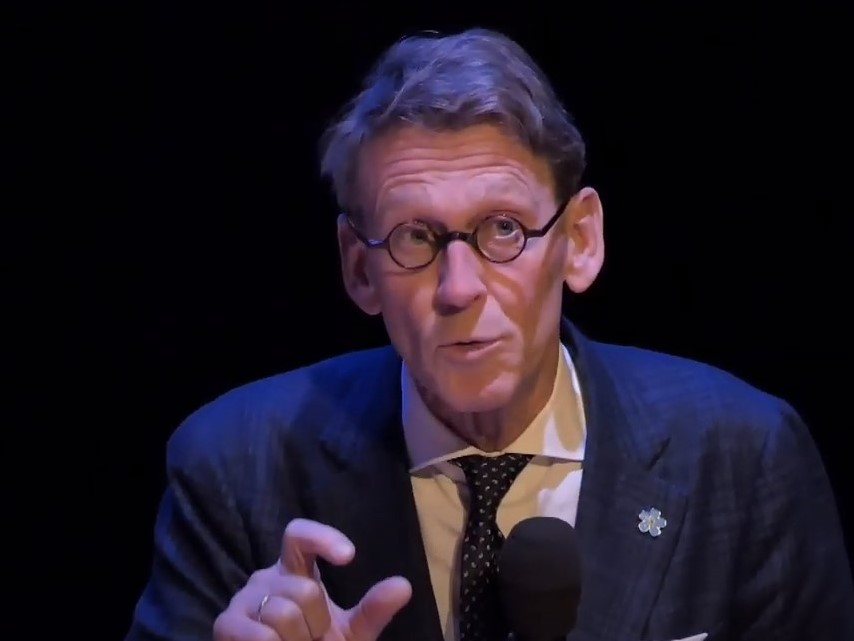
Scheltens in 2018

Philip Scheltens (born 1957) is a Dutch professor of neurology and founder of the Alzheimer Centre, Amsterdam University Medical Centers, location VUmc in Amsterdam.

== Early life, education and career ==
Philip Scheltens was born in Dordrecht, Netherlands, where he grew up in a family of four. His father led a factory. His grandfather developed Alzheimer's disease in those years, which made an impression on his grandson. Philip attended the Christelijk Lyceum, where he graduated in 1976. As a teenager he was an enthusiastic drummer in several bands and was fascinated by science and mechanics.

After his graduation, he studied medicine at the Vrije Universiteit (VU) Amsterdam. He obtained his medical degree in 1984 and started his career in neurology. During his PhD, which he defended and received om March 3, 1993, he developed MRI criteria to score hippocampus atrophy for the diagnosis of Alzheimer's disease. In 2000 he was appointed professor of Cognitive Neurology at the Vrije Universiteit Amsterdam. In that same year he founded the Alzheimer Center, which he directed until end of 2021. As from 2022 he is staff neurologist at the Alzheimer Center which he combines with his role as head of EQT Life Sciences Dementia Fund (formerly known as LSP).

== Achievements ==
Scheltens' work has changed the way Alzheimer's disease is diagnosed. While diagnosis used to be based on specific signs and symptoms and exclusion of treatable causes, he was the first to add MRI criteria for hippocampal atrophy, associated with Alzheimer's' disease in the 1990s, which improved the diagnostic classification of this type of dementia and fueled development of new diagnostics.

He was one of the first in the Netherlands to start a dementia clinic and started the Amsterdam Dementia cohort, currently the largest collection of clinical and biomarker data. This enabled him to initiate, together with colleagues, new diagnostic research criteria for Alzheimer's disease based on the presence of a clinical phenotype and the presence of amyloid, as reflected in cerebrospinal fluid. This change from a phenomenological, purely symptom driven, diagnosis to a diagnosis based on biomarkers greatly enhanced sensitivity and specificity. Higher diagnostic precision is the crucial step to develop effective therapy, as patients with homogeneous underlying pathology can be included for therapeutic trials targeting the causative mechanism. The new protein-based diagnostic criteria he fathered are now implemented for trials worldwide and the first hopeful results have emerged.

Scheltens has improved societal awareness and acceptance of dementia, and prioritized dementia among the top necessities on the Dutch and European research agenda. He initiated a large scientific and societal action plan to improve prevention, treatment and care for dementia in the Netherlands, entitled Deltaplan Dementie in 2012, which has already supported a large number of research projects on dementia, increased societal awareness and improved health care for dementia patients.

In 2011 Scheltens became a member of the Royal Netherlands Academy of Arts and Sciences (KNAW).

In November 2018 Expertscape recognized Dr. Scheltens as #6 in the world for expertise in Alzheimer's disease.

== Present occupation and academic tasks ==
- 2000–present: Full Professor of (Cognitive) Neurology
- 2000–2021: Director of Alzheimer Center Amsterdam, Amsterdam UMC
- 2020–present: head of the EQT Dementia Fund (formerly LSP).
- 2022–present: staff neurologist Alzheimer Center Amsterdam, Amsterdam UMC
- Co-editor-in-chief, Alzheimer's Research & Therapy

== Publications ==
Scheltens has authored or coauthored over 1100 publications
