= Vanitas with Sunflower and Jewelry Box =

Painting by Maria van Oosterwijck

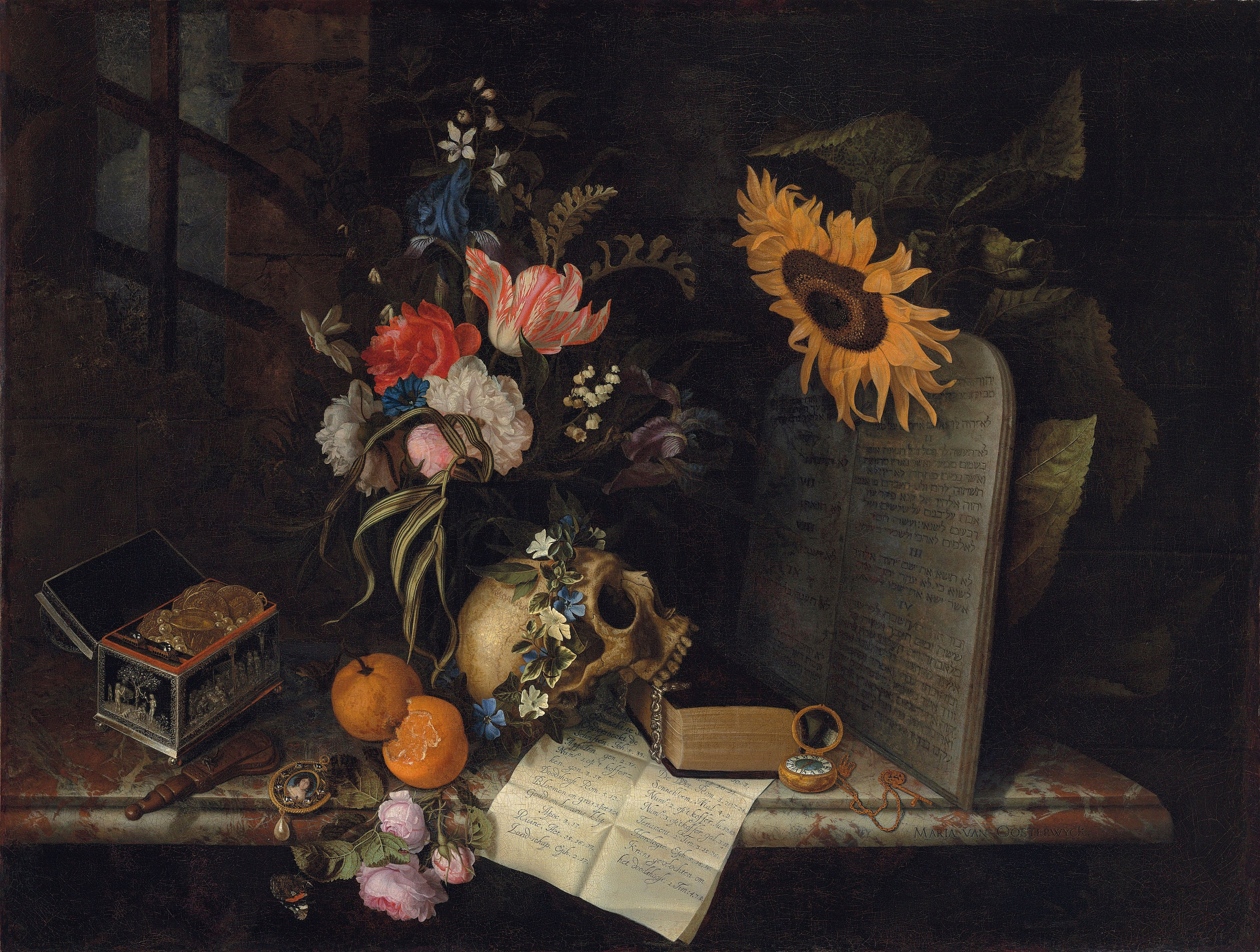
- Artist: Maria van Oosterwijck
- Year: circa 1675
- Medium: oil on canvas
- Dimensions: 82 cm × 105 cm (32 in × 41 in)
- Location: Rijksmuseum, Amsterdam

Vanitas with Sunflower and Jewelry Box (undated, circa 1675) is an oil on canvas painting by the Dutch painter Maria van Oosterwijck. It is an example of Dutch Golden Age painting and was purchased in January 2023 for €1.3 million from a German collector by the Rijksmuseum as their first work in their collection by her.

Van Oosterwijck is known for her still life paintings of flowers but occasionally included other objects of interest such as a jewelry box or skull such as in this one. The size and format of this painting echoes the ones made by other still life painters for the leading art cabinets of her day, but the early provenance of this painting is still unknown. The work emulates that of her teacher Jan Davidsz. de Heem, who was a specialist in the vanitas genre, with or without flowers. It is from him that she learned how to place objects in a triangular form on a plinth to create a sense of depth, and this painting shows her ability to differentiate various textures while executing perfect perspective, especially with the lettering on display in a handwritten note (which is itself a list of things on display), as well as the Hebrew lettering on the two tablets listing the Ten Commandments.

According to Arnold Houbraken, writing soon after his friend Vincent van der Vinne died in 1702, she was 'the daughter of a preacher and brought up her younger nephew Jakobus van Assendelft as her own son to be a preacher after her parents died'. He listed her as the first painter after his profile of Van der Vinne himself, who was also known for vanitas paintings with objects surrounding papers with text hanging from a plinth.

This painting could possibly have been meant as an instructional guide for this nephew, as the handwritten note explains the religious symbolism of the objects. The painting was sold by Christie's in 2012 and the auction description text claimed the handwritten note "consists of words and phrases such as 'Sunflower', 'Skull' and 'Number 1' on the box, each of which is accompanied by a Biblical verse. Next to the word 'Apples' is 'Gen. 2.17', which leads to the passage in Genesis in which the Lord warns against eating from the Tree of Knowledge, while the sunflower corresponds to Malachi 4.2, ...the 'sun of righteousness'...". "Armed with this key, viewers observing the skull turned away from the gold coins and jewels to face the sunflower and tablets can in turn meditate on the relationship between faith and the exemplars set out in the Commandments."

Assuming the skull being 'turned away' from the objects on the left, it is probable that the diamond-studded medaillon next to the 'leper-clapper' (listed on the paper as "Lazarus-klap") is one of the pair of diamond-studded pendants noted by Houbraken as awarded to the artist by "De Keizer Leopoldus en zyne gemalinne". This gift was in exchange for a painting, and is probably the Vanitas (including the same 'leper-clapper') documented in 1730 in Schloss Ambras. Since the portrait is clearly female, this could be a portrait of the dark-haired Claudia Felicitas of Austria, second wife of Leopold I, Holy Roman Emperor, who married him in 1673 but died young soon after this painting was made in 1676 of tuberculosis. Speculations that this could be a self-portrait do not fit with the opulent jewelry.

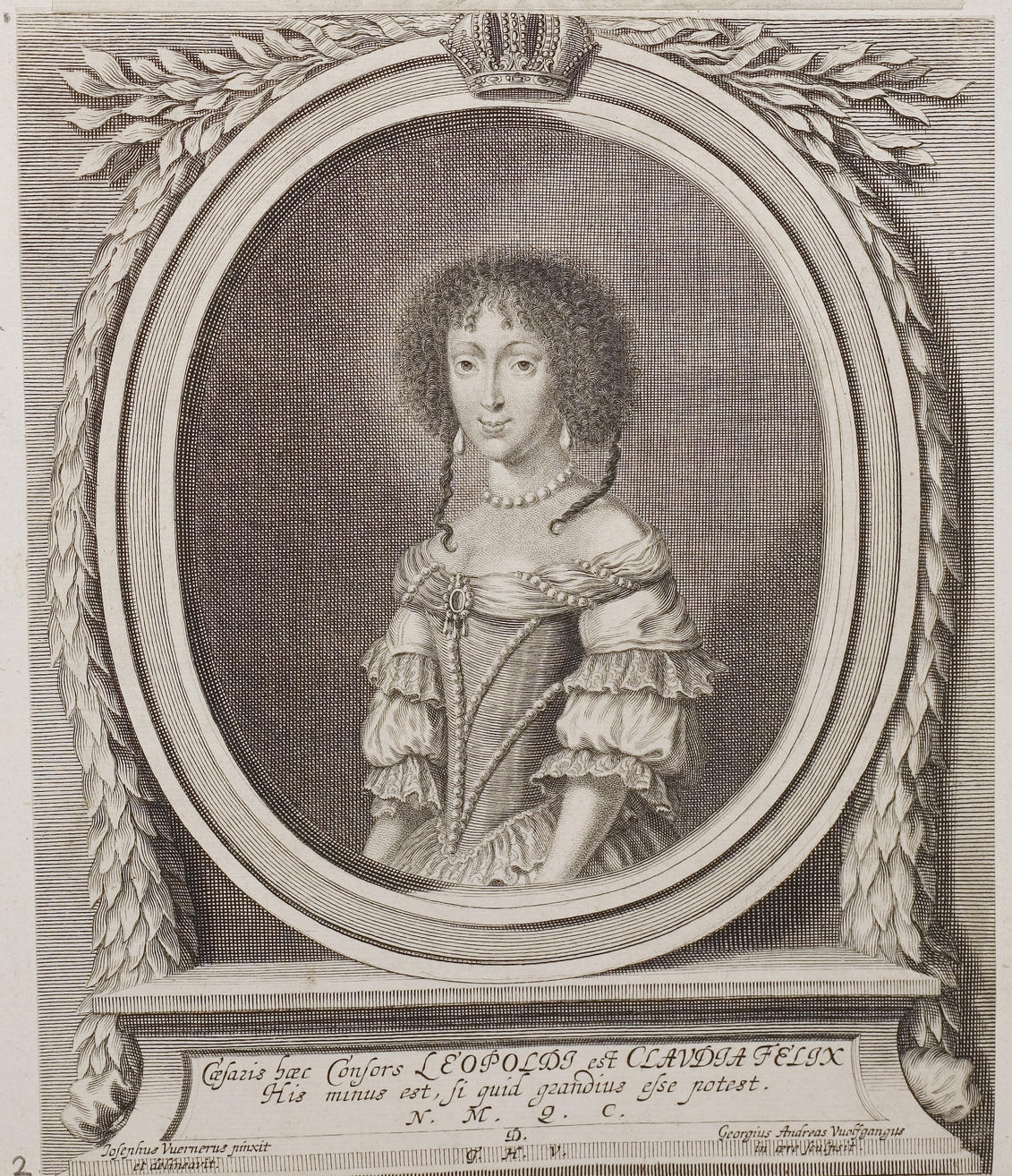
Engraved portrait of Claudia Felicitas of Austria, wearing similar pearl jewelry, circa 1673

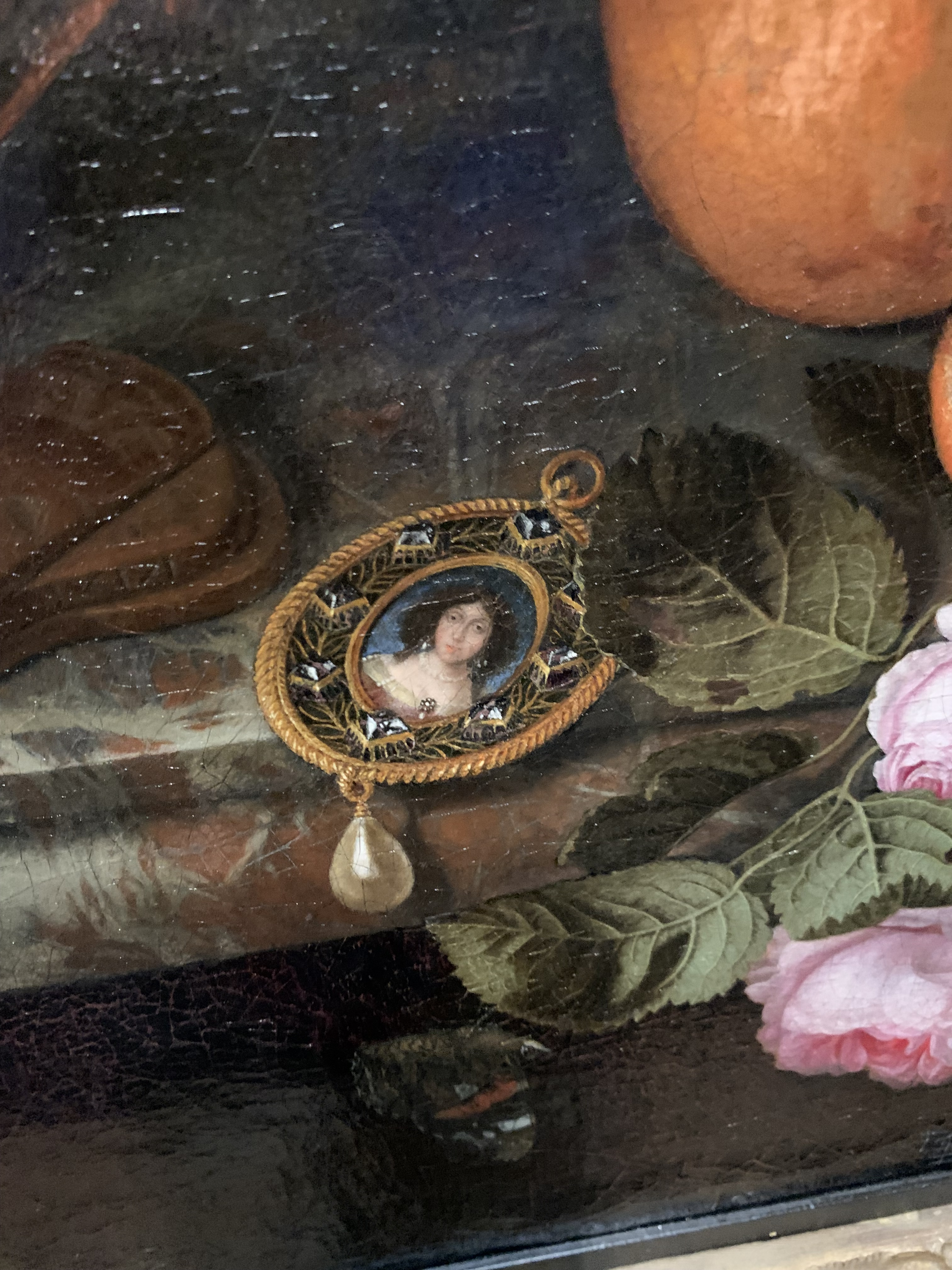
Detail of the portrait miniature showing the pearl-wrapped decolleté shawl

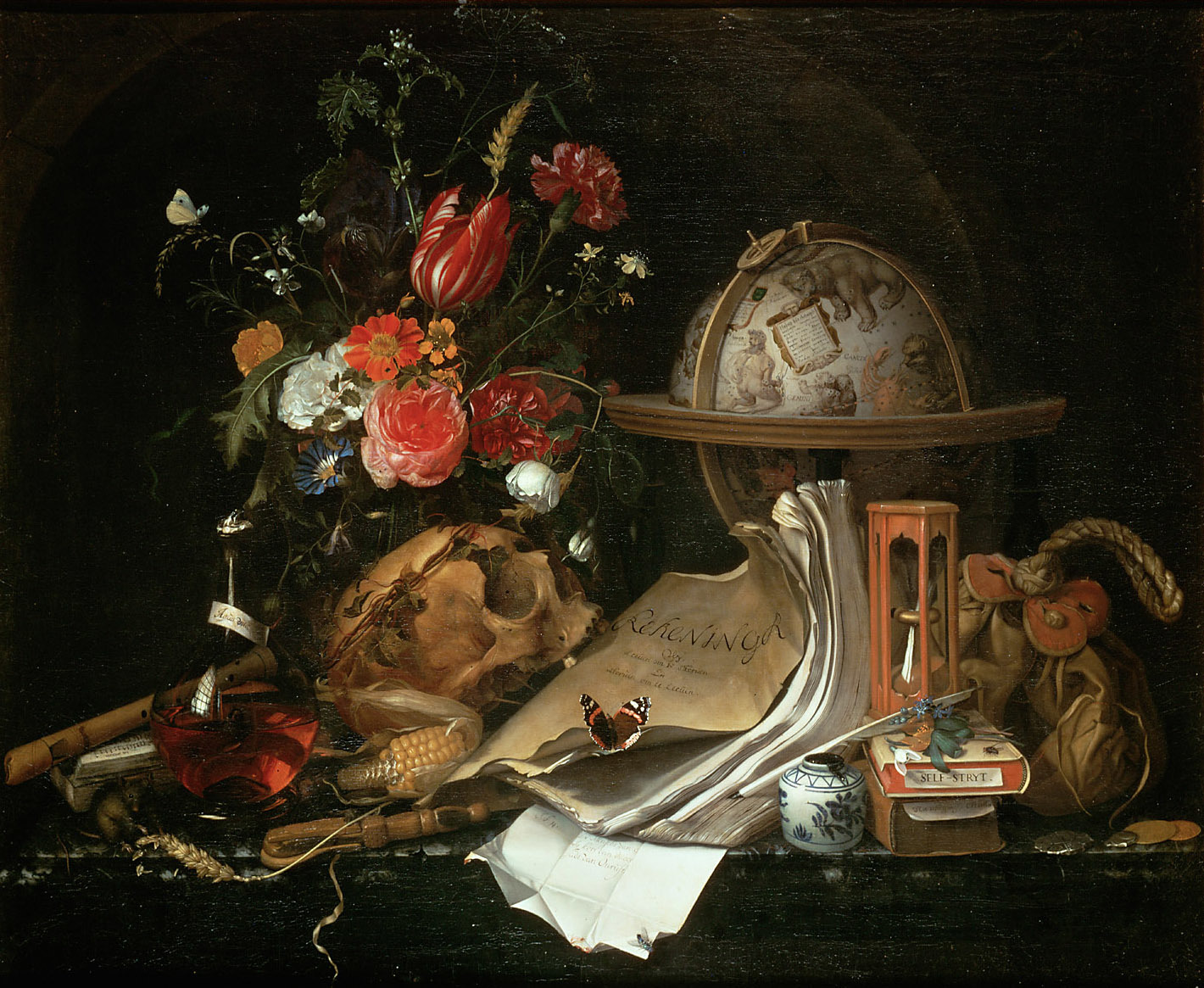
Vanitas by Van Oosterwijck, dated 1668

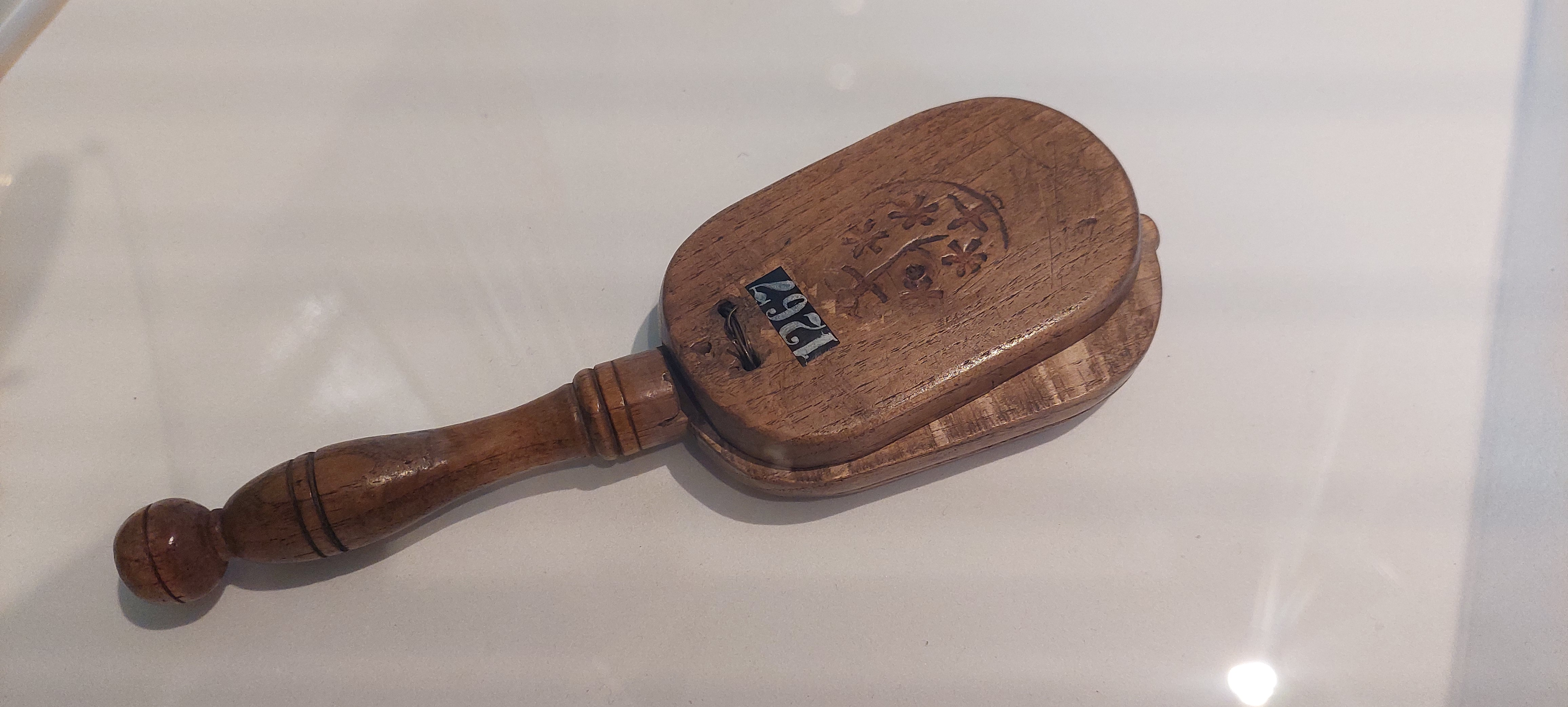
An early Dutch leper-clapper from 1794
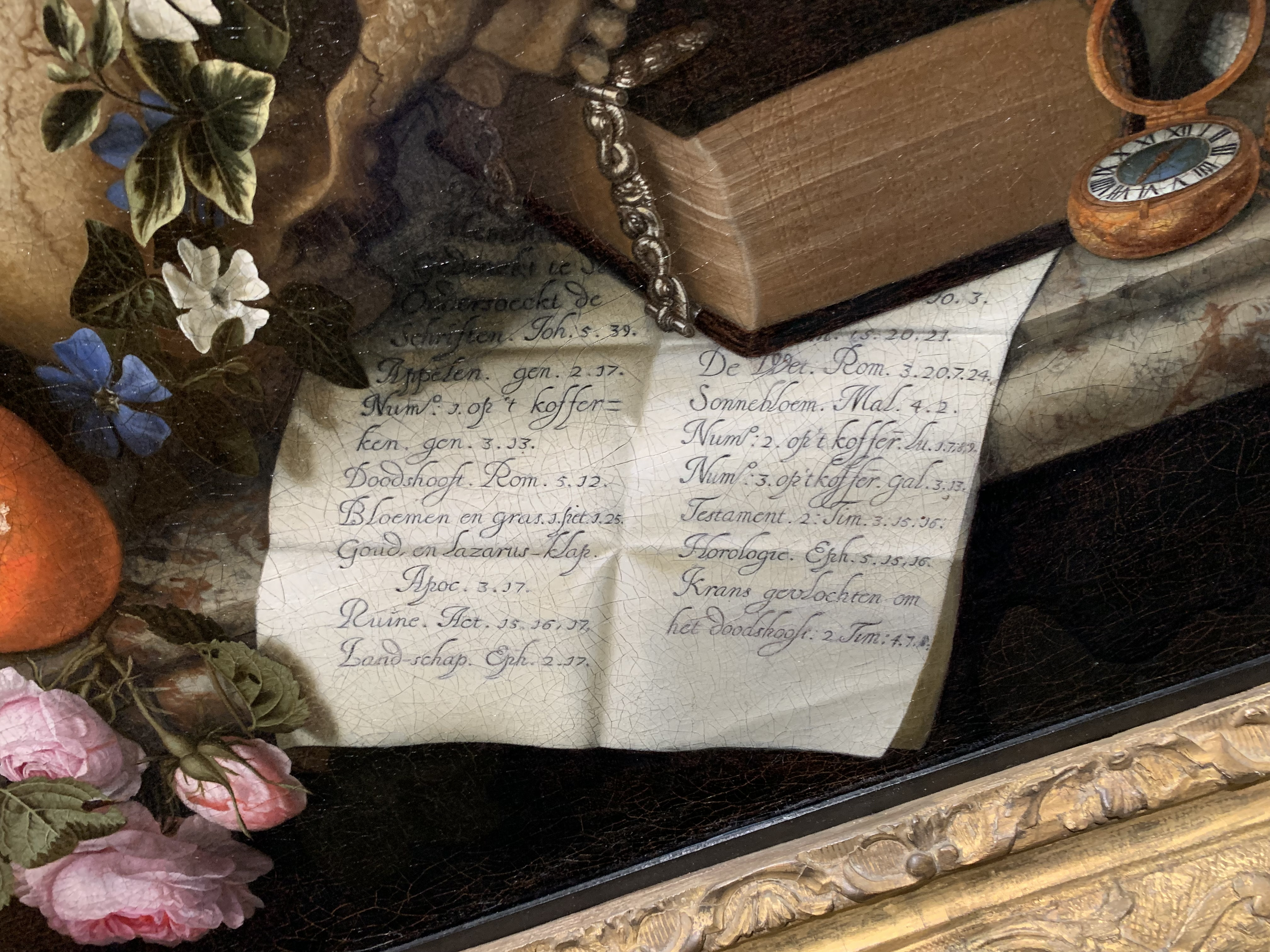
Detail of the paper list

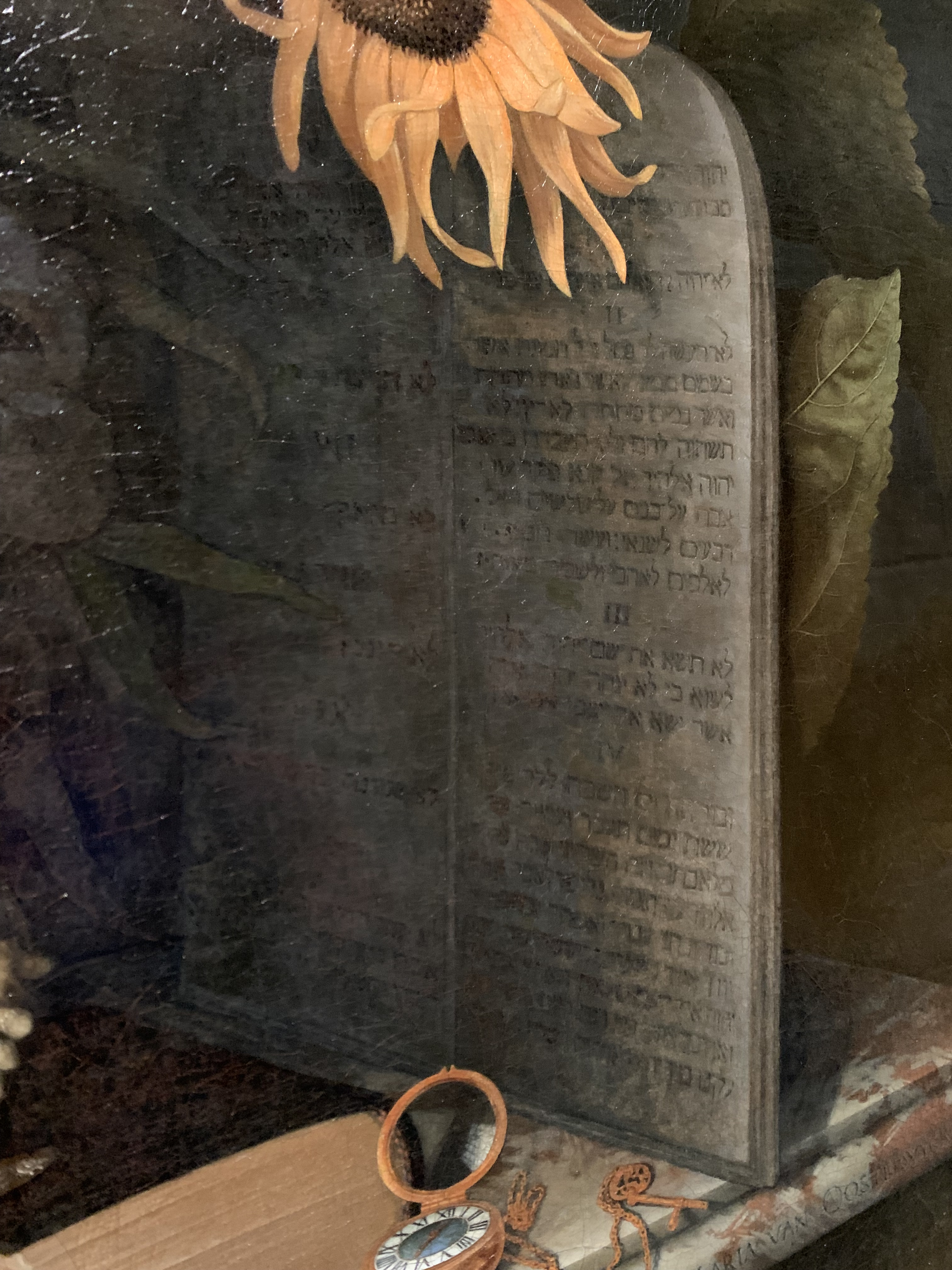
Detail of the tablets with the ten commandments

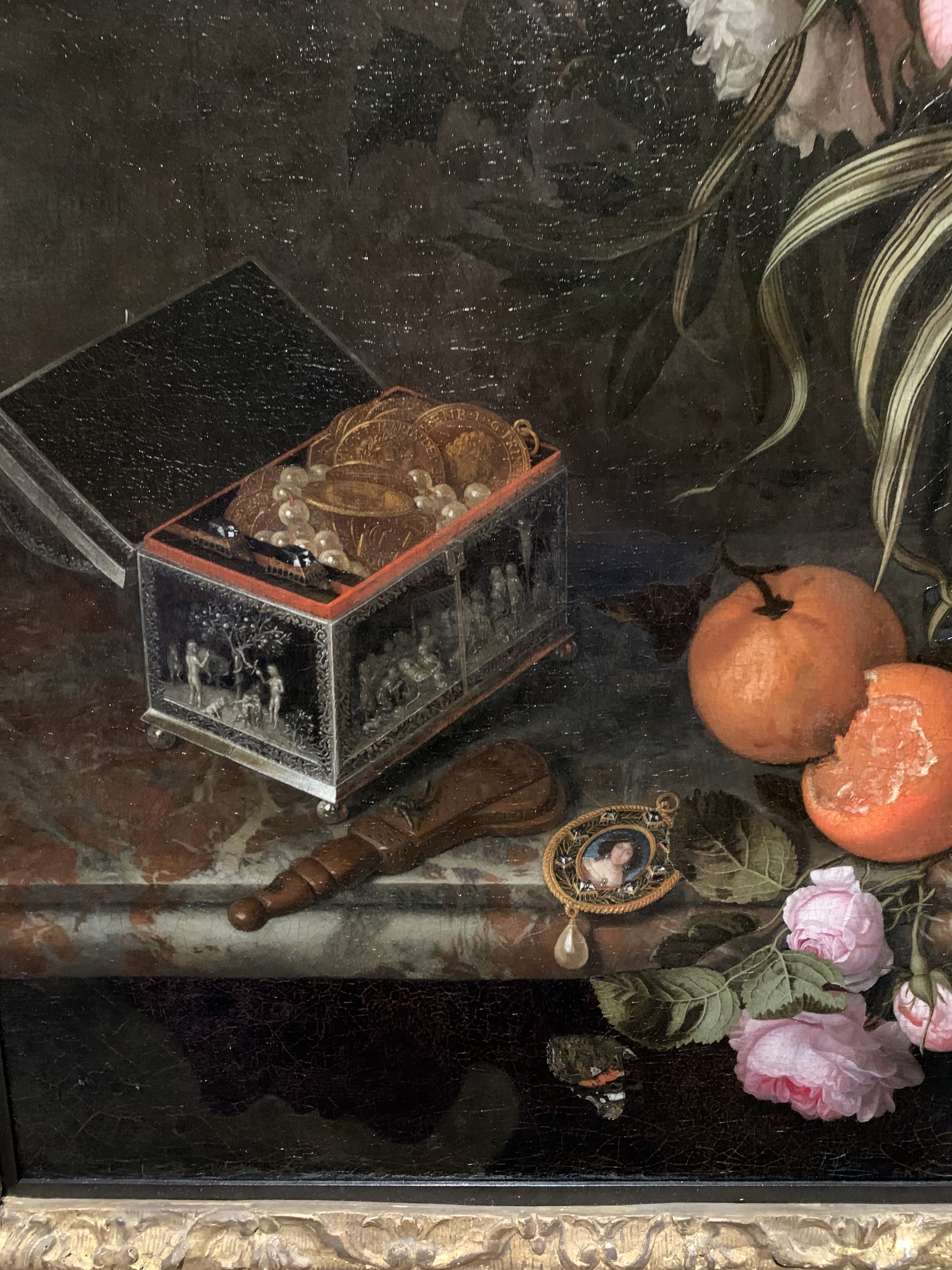
Detail of the jewelry box
