= Abraham Carel Wertheim =

Dutch politician

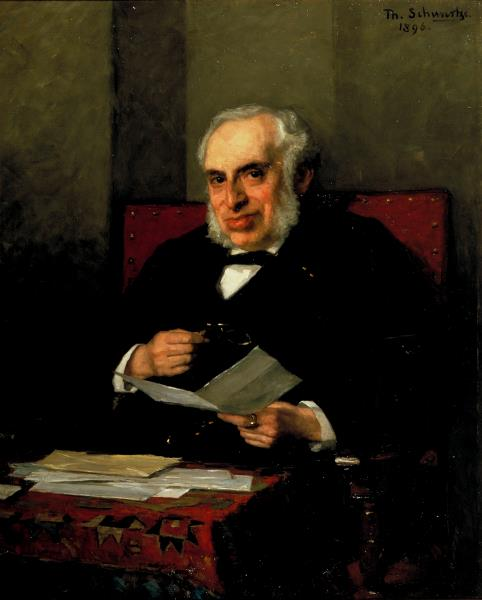
Painting of Wertheim by Therese Schwartze, currently in the collection of the Joods Historisch Museum.

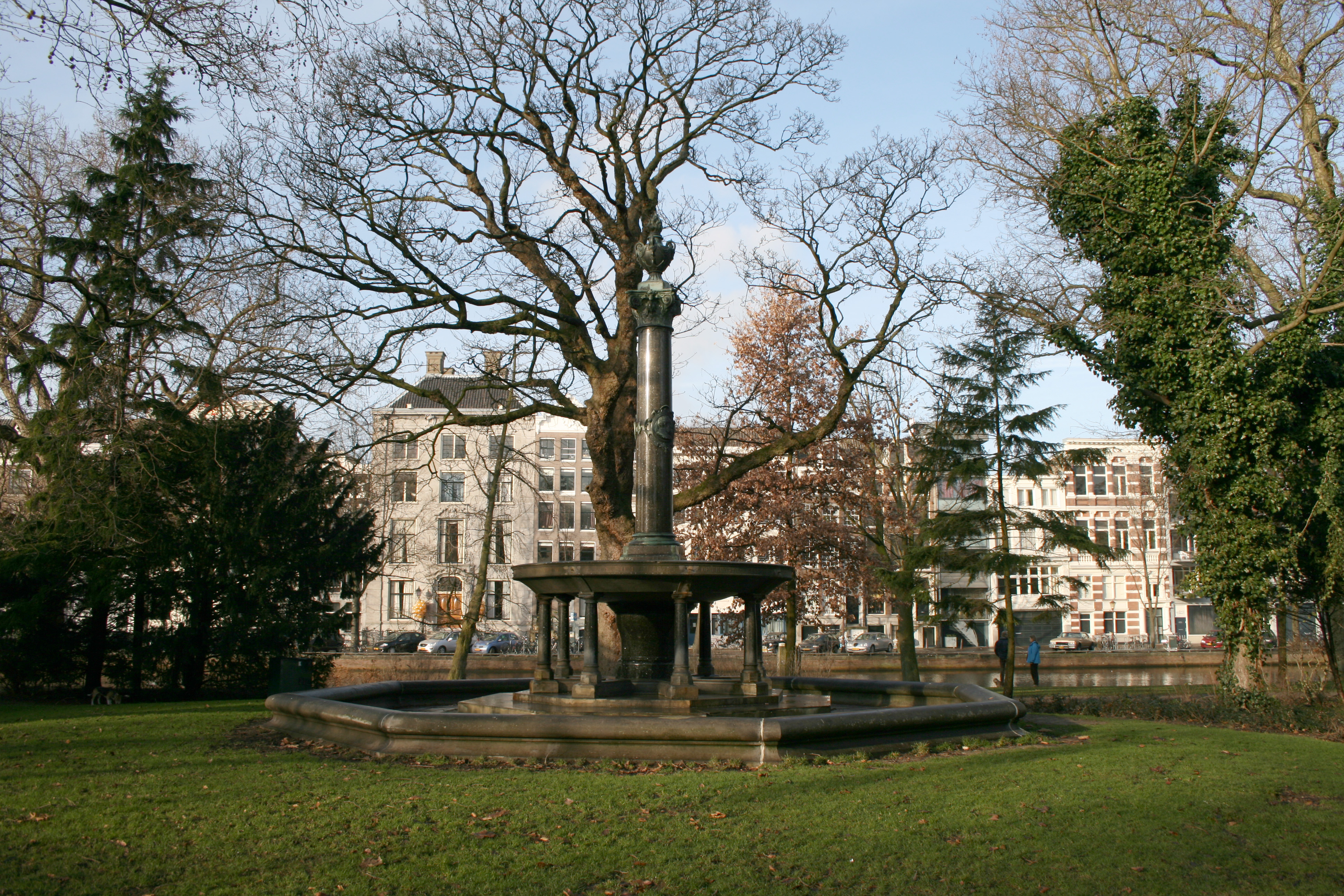
Fountain commemorating Wertheim in the Wertheimpark in Amsterdam

Abraham Carel Wertheim, also known as A.C. Wertheim (Amsterdam, 12 December 1832 – Amsterdam, 30 November 1897) was a banker, politician, and philanthropist from Amsterdam, the Netherlands. Born into a family of emancipated and enlightened Dutch Jews, he developed his banking and investment skills at Wertheim & Gompertz, an investment firm founded by his uncle Johannes Wertheim. He was subsequently apprentice at prominent banker Julius Königswärter, who introduced him into cultural salons in Amsterdam. Upon his marriage to his cousin Rosalie Marie Wertheim he became a partner in Wertheim & Gompertz. This bank, together with a number of other firms, played a significant role in financing the building of new railroads in the United States.

He was a patron of amateur drama in Amsterdam, and stimulated the development of the (later Royal) Dutch National Theatre Company (Vereeniging Het Nederlandsch Tooneel), soon the only major theatre company in the city. It played at the Municipal Theatre and the Grand Théatre. Wertheim was intimately involved in the rebuilding of the Municipal Theatre on the Leidseplein square after it burnt down in 1890. He was a mason.

He was involved in a large number of Jewish communal organisations in Amsterdam, including being the president of the Jewish community. While he was not observant himself, he did not advocate reform and considered Orthodoxy the only representative movement within Judaism.

As a liberal politician he was a member of the States-Provincial for North Holland (1866-1886) and from 1886 until his death of the Senate.

He was a Knight of the Order of the Netherlands Lion. He is commemorated in the Wertheimpark in Amsterdam East, which contains a monument dedicated to him.

He had eight children, of whom three died in childhood. His brother-in-law was Barend Joseph Stokvis. His nephew was pedagogist Philip Kohnstamm, and his grandchildren were composer Rosy Wertheim and sculptor Jobs Wertheim.
