= Geertgen Wyntges =

Dutch artist (1636–1712)

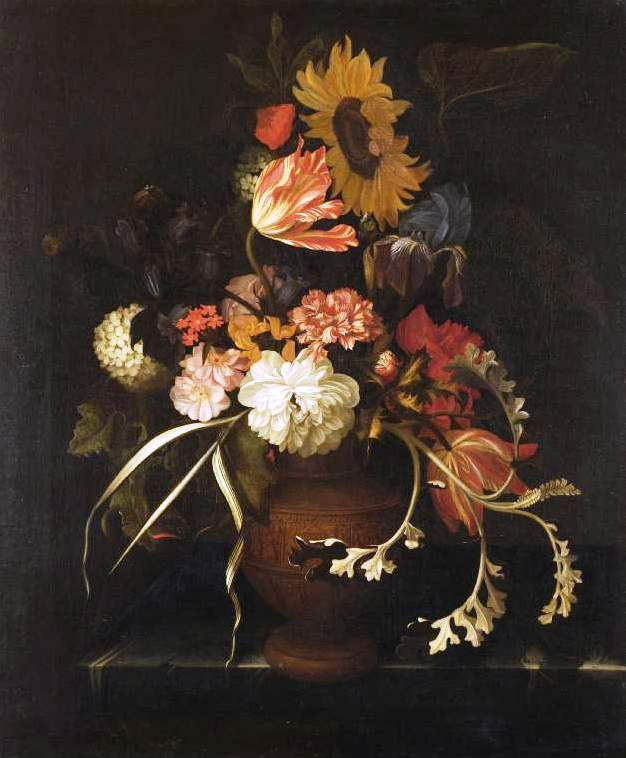
Vase of flowers in urn on stone slab, ca. 1675

Geertgen Wyntges (1636, Delft – 1712, Delft), was a Dutch Golden Age flower painter who assisted the painter Maria van Oosterwijck.

== Biography ==
According to Houbraken she was the servant of Maria Oosterwyk in Amsterdam who helped her mix her paints. While Houbraken was working on his book, the painter Nicolaas Verkolje told him he had visited her in Delft two years beforehand and she had told him an amusing story about her former employer and the flower painter Willem van Aelst. She said that their workshops were adjoining and they could see each other through their windows. Aelst had wanted to court Oosterwyck, but she remained single.

According to the RKD Wyntges is also known as Geertje Pieters and was the pupil of Maria van Oosterwijck She was the granddaughter of the art collector Melchior Wyntges who Karel van Mander mentioned in his Schilder-boeck. She was related to the family of Maria van Oosterwyck. Constantijn Huygens composed two poems in her honor (one was dedicated to her and her employer Oosterwyck).

== Cultural Portrayals ==
I Am You, a 2025 novel by Victoria Redel, presents a first-person fictional account by Wyntges (as "Gertje Pieters") of her relationship with Oosterwyk (as "Maria Oosterwijck"), first as a servant, then developing as her apprentice, lover, and artistic collaborator.
