= Charles Mathieu Schols =

Dutch surveyor (1849–1897)

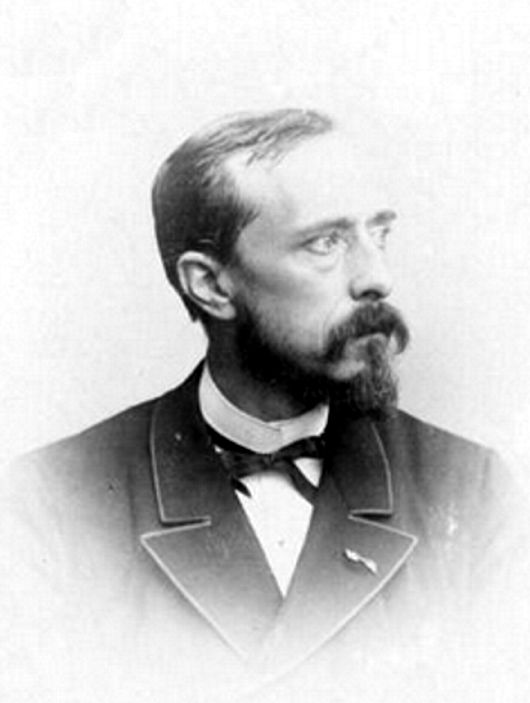
Charles Mathieu Schols (1849-1897)

Charles Mathieu Schols (28 March 1849, in Maastricht – 17 March 1897, in Delft) was a Dutch surveyor, mathematician and pioneer of geodesy. He was elected a member of the Royal Netherlands Academy of Arts and Sciences.
