= Pauline Schaap =

Dutch biologist

Pauline Schaap is a Dutch cell biologist and evolutionary biologist. She is a professor of Developmental Signalling at the University of Dundee., a corresponding member of the Royal Netherlands Academy of Arts and Sciences, a Fellow of the Royal Society of Biology, and a Fellow of the Royal Society of Edinburgh.

She studies the evolution of multicellularity and cell differentiation in social amoebae.

== Biography ==
Schaap received her PhD in 1987 from the University of Leiden. She was a professor at the University of Leiden until 1999, when she moved to the University of Dundee where she is currently a professor. She became a corresponding member of the Royal Netherlands Academy of Arts and Sciences in 2011.

== Professional contributions ==
Schaap and her collaborators established the first molecular phylogeny of the Dictyostelia. That work showed that complex multicellular fruiting bodies had evolved multiple times independently, contrary to what had previously been generally thought. More recently, Schaap and her team showed that the molecular pathway for multicellular development in dictyostelids had evolved from an ancestral encystment pathway present in single-celled amoebae, thus contributing to elucidating the molecular basis for the evolution of multicellularity
