= Maria van Oosterwijck =

Dutch artist (1630–1693)

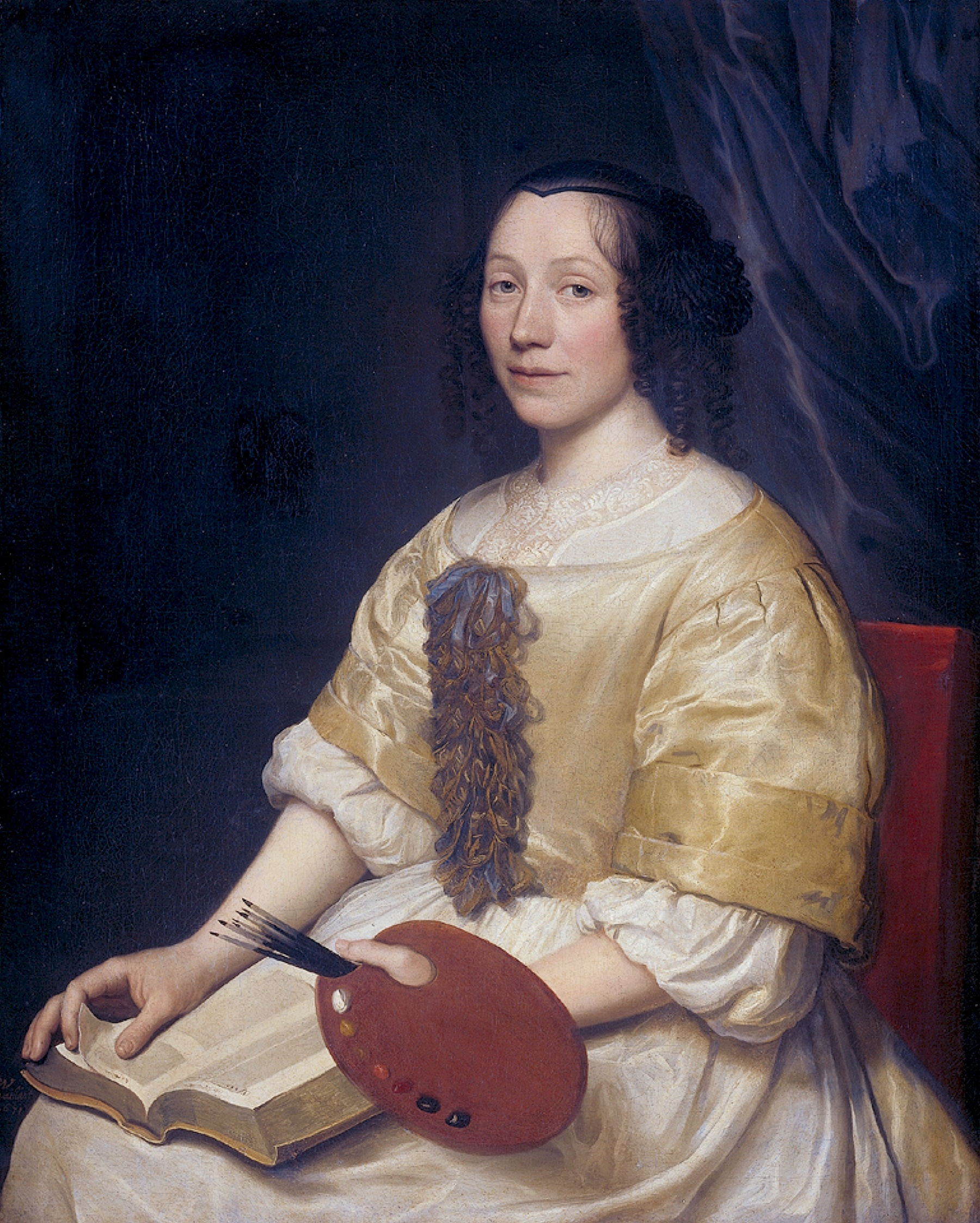
Portrait of Maria van Oosterwijck, 1671, by Wallerant Vaillant

Maria van Oosterwijck (1630–1693), also spelled Oosterwyck, was a Dutch Golden Age painter, specialising in richly detailed flower paintings and other still lifes.

== Life and work ==
Maria van Oosterwijck was born in 1630 in Nootdorp, a town located near Delft in South Holland, the Netherlands. Her date of birth is generally listed as 20 August, but some sources state that it was 27 August. Her father was a Dutch Reformed Church minister, as was her grandfather. When she was quite young, her father took her to the studio of the masterful still life painter Jan Davidsz. de Heem. Under de Heem's influence, van Oosterwijck developed her interest in floral painting. She became his student, and showed herself to have a talent for vividly painting realistic creations.

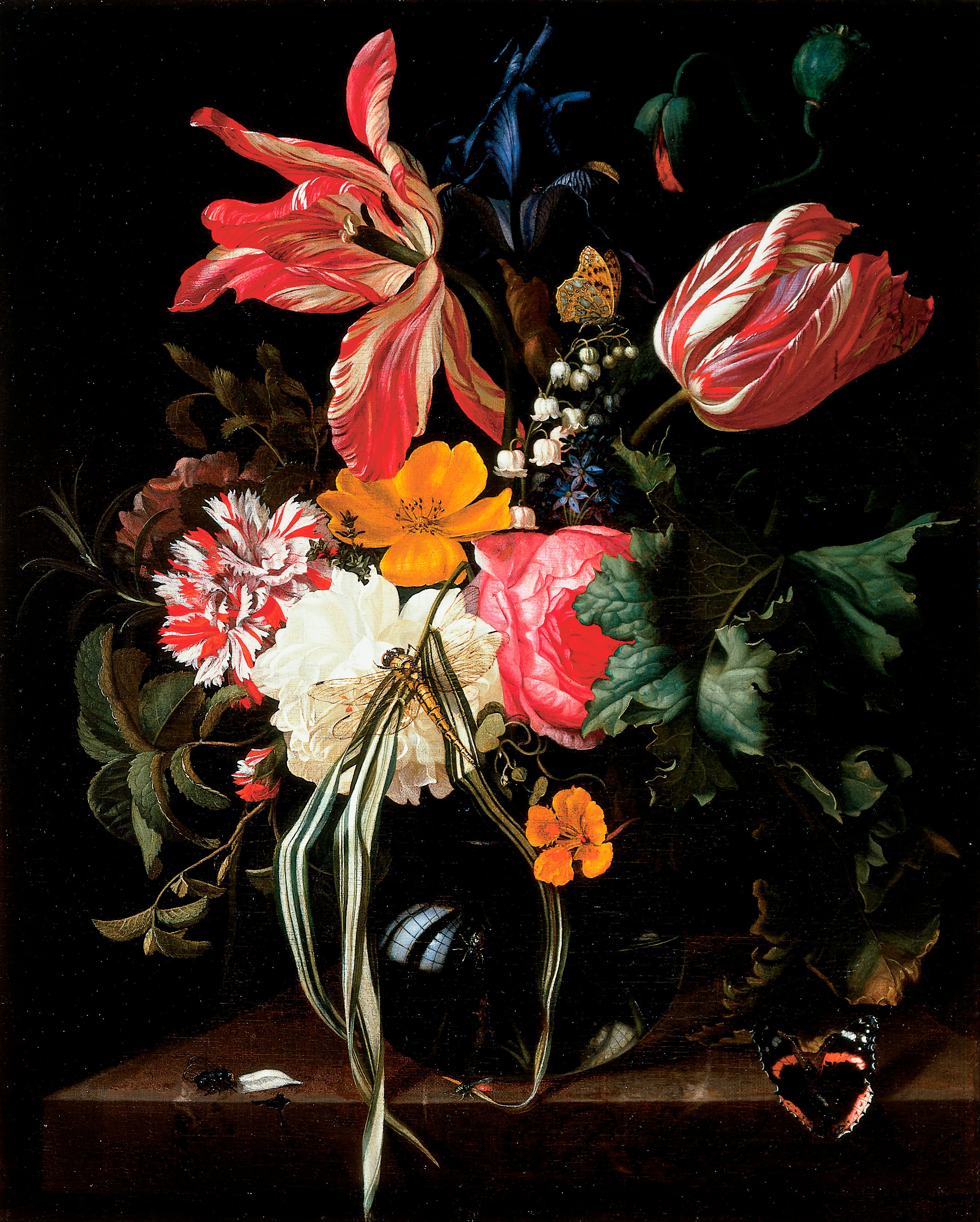
Flower Still Life, 1669, Cincinnati Art Museum

Van Oosterwijck initially worked in Delft and later moved to Utrecht. She worked with de Heem, and years later she produced her first professional piece which had been created independently. When de Heem moved to Antwerp, van Oosterwijck had ample opportunity for independent painting.

Sometime in the early to mid-1670s, she moved to Amsterdam, where her studio was opposite the workshop of fellow flower painter Willem van Aelst. Van Aelst courted her, but she refused his hand, and he reportedly stopped pursuing her because her devotion to painting was more important to her. Van Oosterwijck remained single throughout her life, but raised her nephew, who had been orphaned.

In addition to being a talented painter, she was also a successful businesswoman; she obtained the services of an agent in Amsterdam to market her pieces to Germans. Among her patrons were Louis XIV of France, the Holy Roman Emperor Leopold I, Augustus II the Strong, and William III of England. She sold three pieces to the King of Poland. Despite the fact that her skillfully executed paintings of flowers were sought out by Dutch and other collectors, she was denied membership in the painters' guild, because women were not allowed to join.

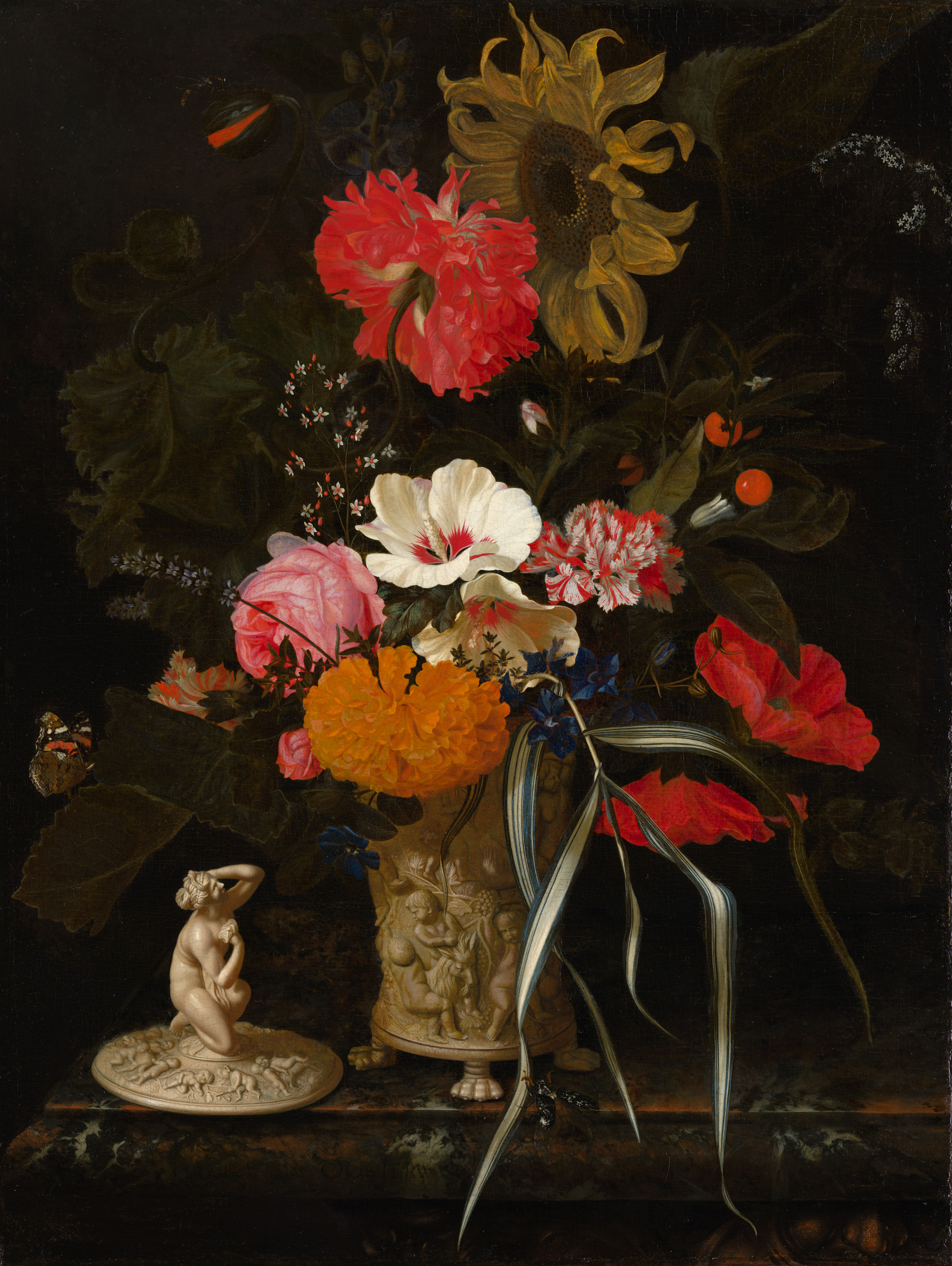
Still Life with Flowers in a Decorative Vase, c. 1670–1675, Mauritshuis

Very few women were professional artists during the 1600s. In a 2004 book on Dutch Golden Age paintings by art historian Christopher Lloyd, van Oosterwijck was the only woman whose work was included. Early writers tended to depict female artists by correlating virtues which were traditionally held by women with similar values gleaned from interpretation of their paintings. Van Oosterwijck, who devoted her life to her painting rather than being a wife and mother, proved a challenging subject for these writers, and their accounts may not portray her as a fully formed personality. The more personal aspects of her paintings were also largely unexplored. This is in contrast to Rachel Ruysch (1664–1750), who was married and had ten children, and was written about in very personable and glowing terms.

As an homage to van Oosterwijck's skill as a floral painter – considered an acceptable vocation for a woman of the time – Wallerant Vaillant painted a portrait of her holding a palette. This 1671 portrait, held in Amsterdam's Rijksmuseum, shows her holding a Bible in her other hand. Another portrait of her, attributed to Gerard de Lairesse, features her posing with poet Dirk Schelte. In 1673, Schelte had written a poem in tribute to the beauty of van Oosterwijck's paintings, as well as that of her character. The portrait appears to reference the poem, picturing van Oosterwijck, with palette and brushes, as a painter-muse, serving as an inspiration to Schelte the poet.

She taught her servant Geertgen Wyntges, also known as Geertje Pieters, to mix her paints, and trained her as a painter too. After van Oosterwijck died, Wyntges lived independently, supporting herself as a painter.

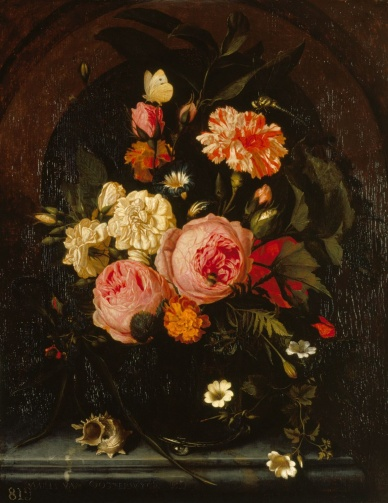
Still Life with Flowers, Insects and a Shell, 1689, Royal Collection. Van Oosterwijck's last known painting.

In 1689, van Oosterwijck created her last known painting, a still life which is in the Collection of Her Majesty the Queen at London's Kensington Palace. This painting, Still Life with Flowers, Insects and a Shell, was acquired by the Royal Collection during Queen Anne's reign, as was another van Oosterwijck work.

Maria van Oosterwijck died at her home in Uitdam, North Holland, about 12 kilometres (7.5 mi) northeast of Amsterdam, in 1693. The date of her death is often reported as 12 November, but some sources claim it was in December.

Arnold Houbraken, a contemporary biographer of Dutch Golden Age artists, eulogized van Oosterwijck, but did not consider her to be a professional artist, despite the very large sums paid for her paintings by such high-profile collectors as various members of European royalty.

== Art ==
Van Oosterwijck created floral paintings and still lifes with allegorical themes during a period in which such works were much sought after in Central Europe. She and Ruysch were judged to be the most eminent still life painters of the Low Countries. Van Oosterwijck's work, using luminous colours, is very richly detailed, sometimes demonstrating chiaroscuro techniques in her use of light and shadow. She frequently painted dark backgrounds, which resulted in increased brilliance of the foregrounds. She helped to transform the genre of the floral still life, painting realistically in a manner similar to the 16th-century Dutch trompe-l'œil tradition. There are very few existing pieces that have been identified as being by van Oosterwijck, most of which are florals, but Houbraken determined that she had created many other still lifes. She is thought to have produced 30 paintings in her career. Many of her paintings were small-format. This was often the case for artists of the time, as large pieces tended to restrict sales opportunities to wealthier clients such as churches or the state.

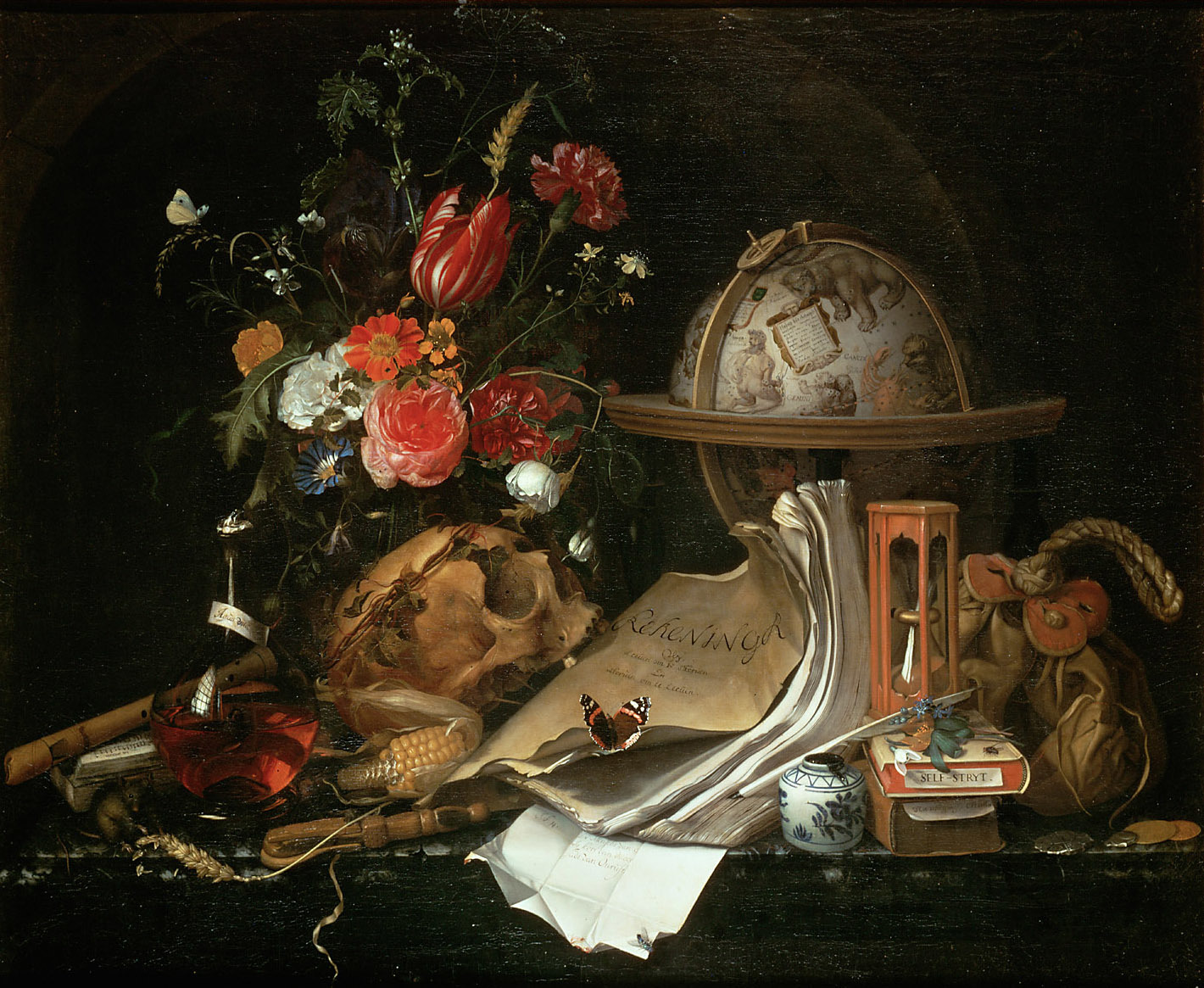
Vanitas-Still Life, 1668, Kunsthistorisches Museum

Through the use of symbolic elements, her paintings reflect themes commonly found in Dutch still life of the 17th-century, such as vanity, impermanence, and the obligation to devote oneself to God. Her vanitas paintings incorporate objects intended to symbolize the ephemeral nature of life; such objects may include skulls, hourglasses, books, globes, partially eaten food, bags of money, insects, wilted leaves, and flowers. She also included symbols of resurrection, giving her work a subtle bitter-sweet quality which is in contrast to some other artists of the time who sometimes, for example, would depict a large pile of skulls in order to deliver the moral message in their vanitas paintings.

Vanessa atalanta, from Flower Still Life

Van Oosterwijck was very religious, and she often symbolically represented her deeply held beliefs in her paintings. The sunflower is symbolic of turning to God. Grapes take on a symbolic religious meaning because of their use to make eucharistic wine. Even colours are used symbolically, with white denoting innocence, yellow indicating divinity, and red symbolizing martyrdom.

Van Oosterwijck painted a recurring poetic embellishment into her still lifes. The red admiral butterfly (Vanessa atalanta) appears in various locations within most of her substantial paintings, sometimes resting on a flower stem, or on the edge of a table with a flower vase, or on a book. The butterfly was used as a device to draw the viewer's attention into the painting and into van Oosterwijck's artistic vision. The butterflies are also symbolic of Christ's resurrection.

== Collections ==
- Cincinnati Art Museum
- Crocker Art Museum (Sacramento, California)
- Denver Art Museum
- Fitzwilliam Museum (Cambridge)
- Kunsthistorisches Museum (Vienna)
- Mauritshuis (The Hague)
- Palatine Gallery in Palazzo Pitti (Florence)
- Royal Collection (London)
- Statens Museum for Kunst (Copenhagen)
- The Rijksmuseum in Amsterdam acquired Vanitas Still Life (ca. 1690) in 2023 for €1.3 million. After a period of research and conservation, it went on display in March 2025. This is only one of only two paintings by van Oosterwijck held by a Dutch institution.

== Gallery ==
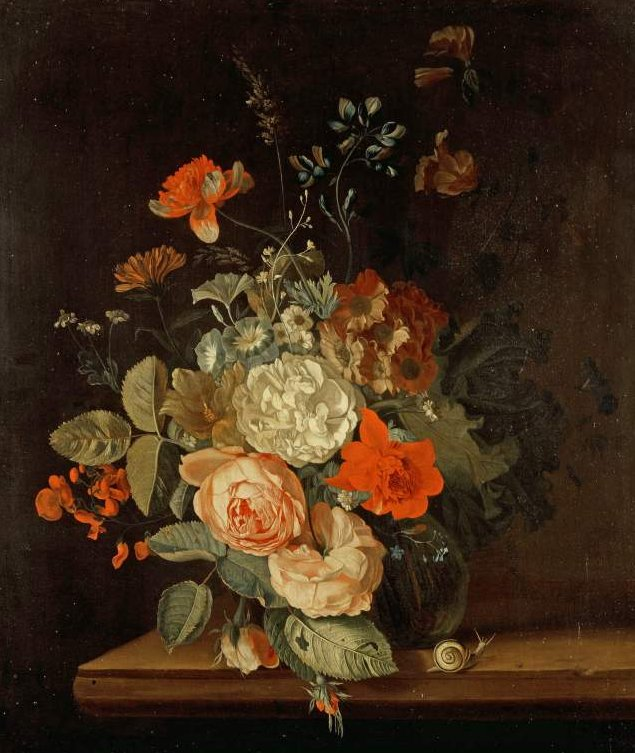
A Vase of Flowers, Fitzwilliam Museum

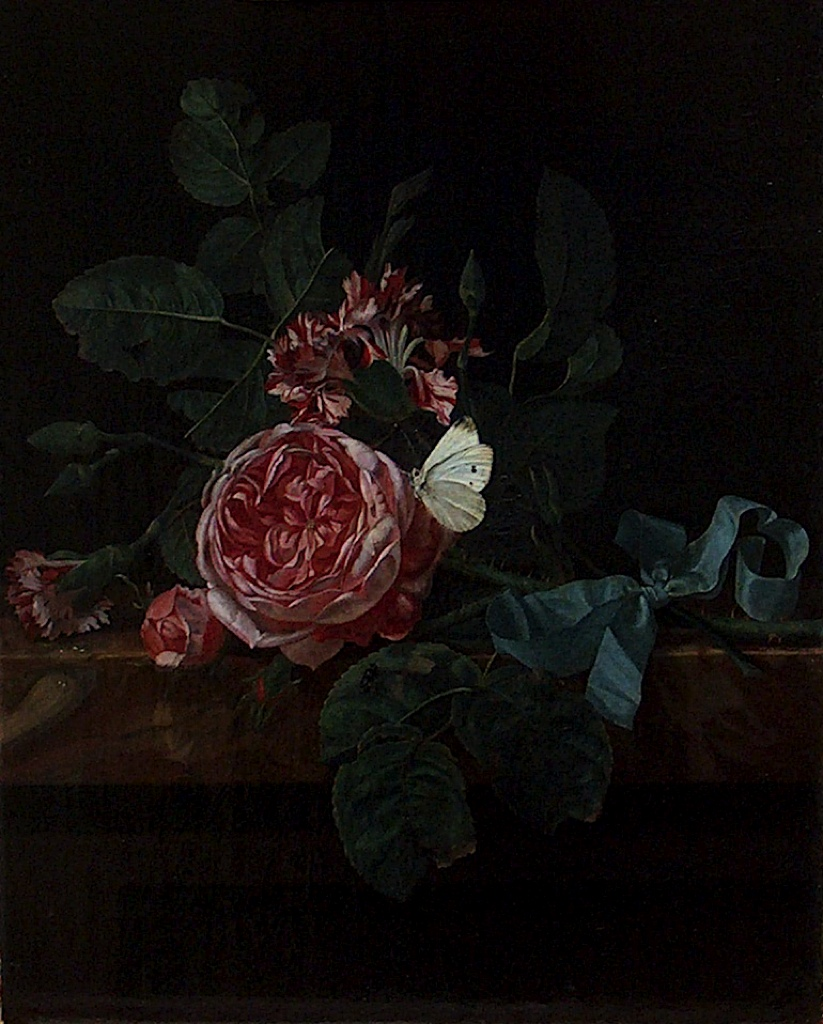
Roses and Butterfly, Crocker Art Museum

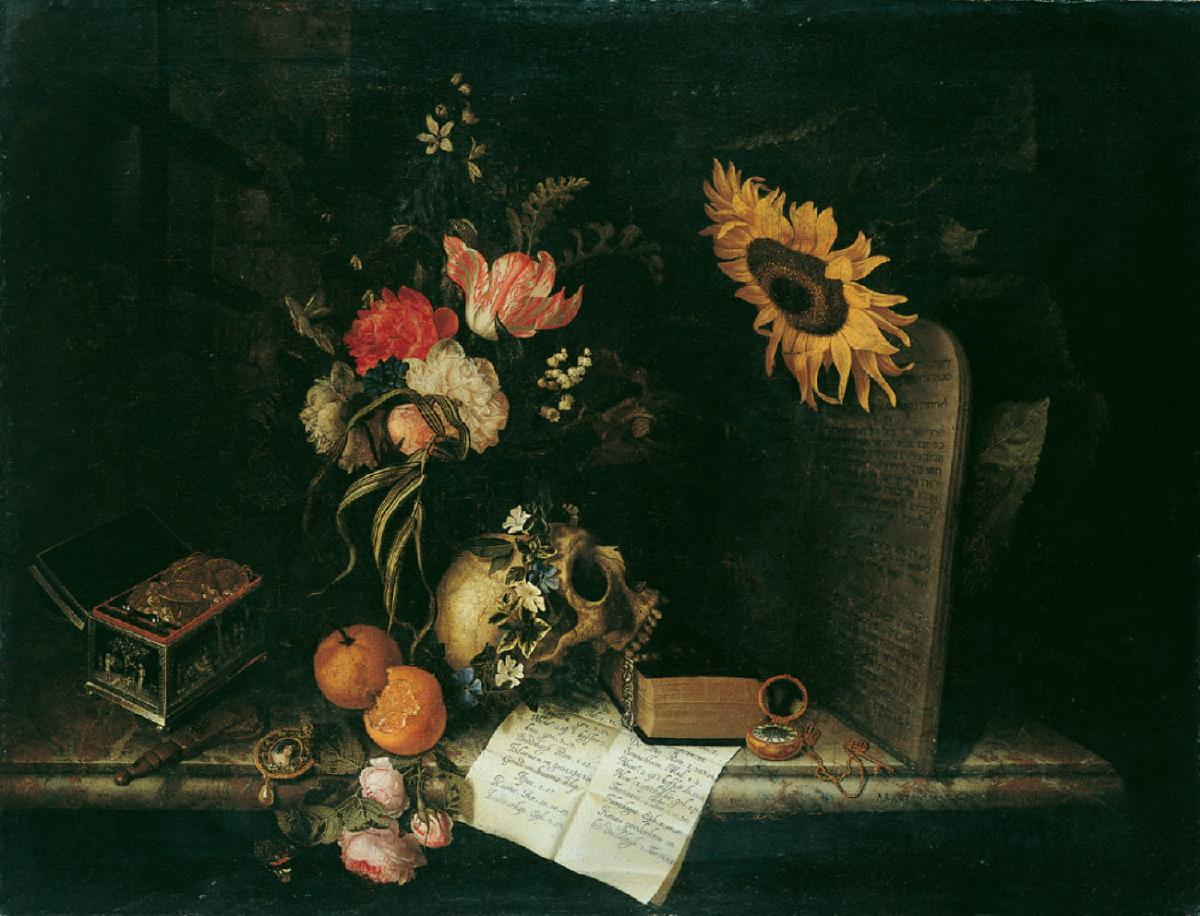
Vanitas with Sunflower and Jewelry Box, c. 1665, Rijksmuseum

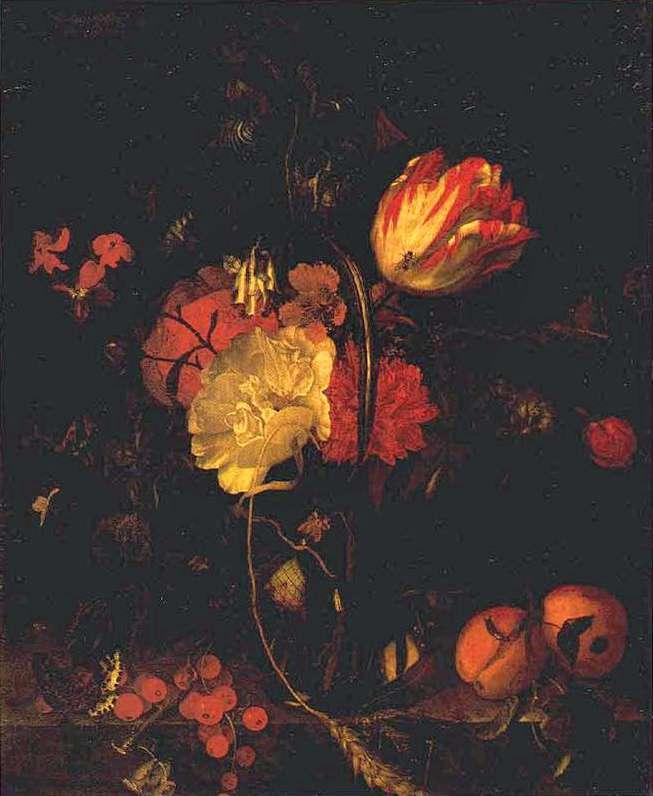
Flowers, Fruit and Insects, c. 1670, Palatine Gallery in Palazzo Pitti

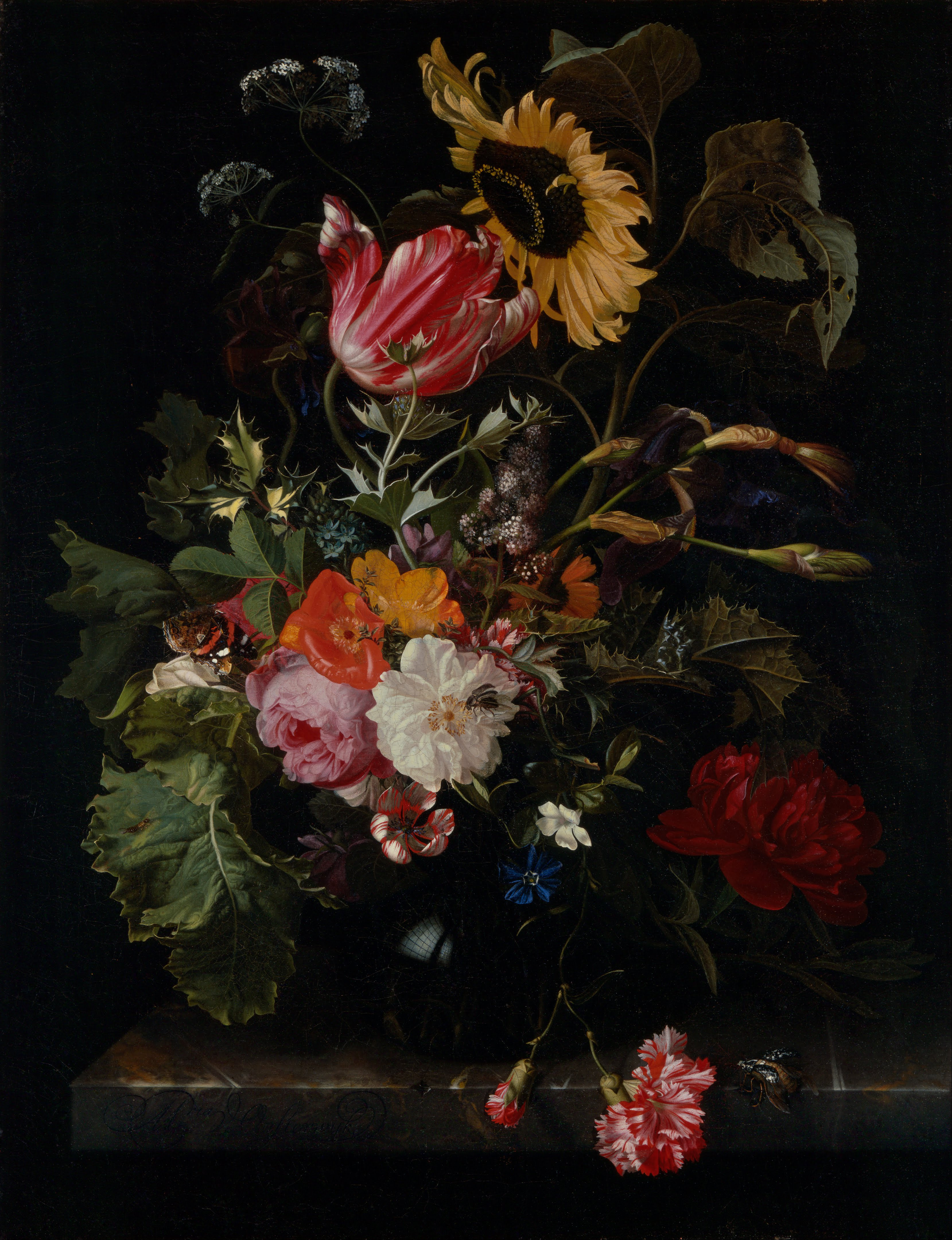
Bouquet of Flowers in a Vase, c. 1670, Denver Art Museum

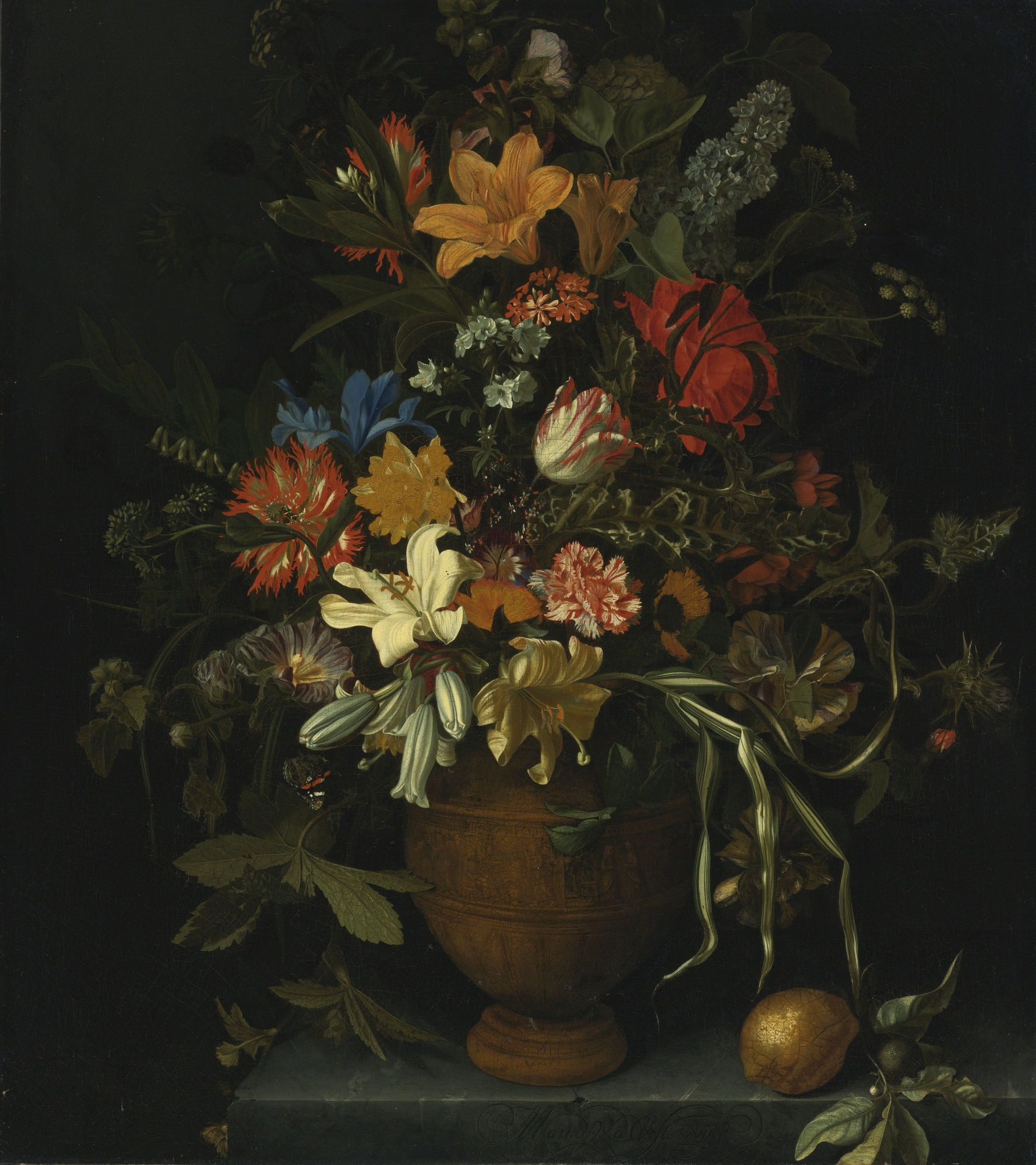
A Floral Still Life ..., 1675

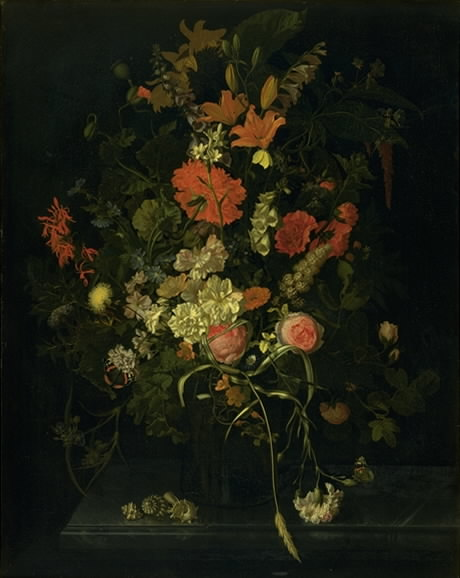
Bouquet of Flowers in a Glass, 1685, Statens Museum for Kunst

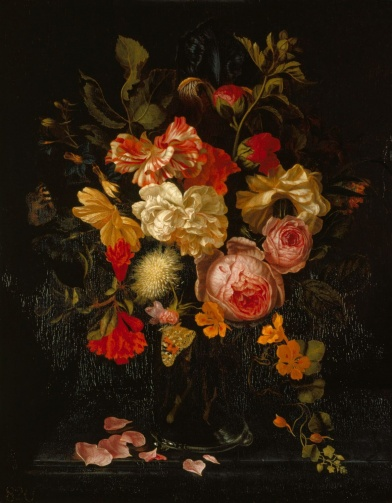
Still Life with Flowers and Butterflies, 1686, Royal Collection

== Sources ==
- Berardi, Marianne (2001). Delia Gaze (ed.). Concise Dictionary of Women Artists. Fitzroy Dearborn. pp. 524–528. ISBN 1-57958-335-0.
- Vigué, Jordi (2002). Great Women Masters of Art. New York: Watson-Guptill. pp. 109–114. ISBN 0-8230-2114-9.
