= George Alexander Koppen =

Dutch aviator

Gijs Koppen
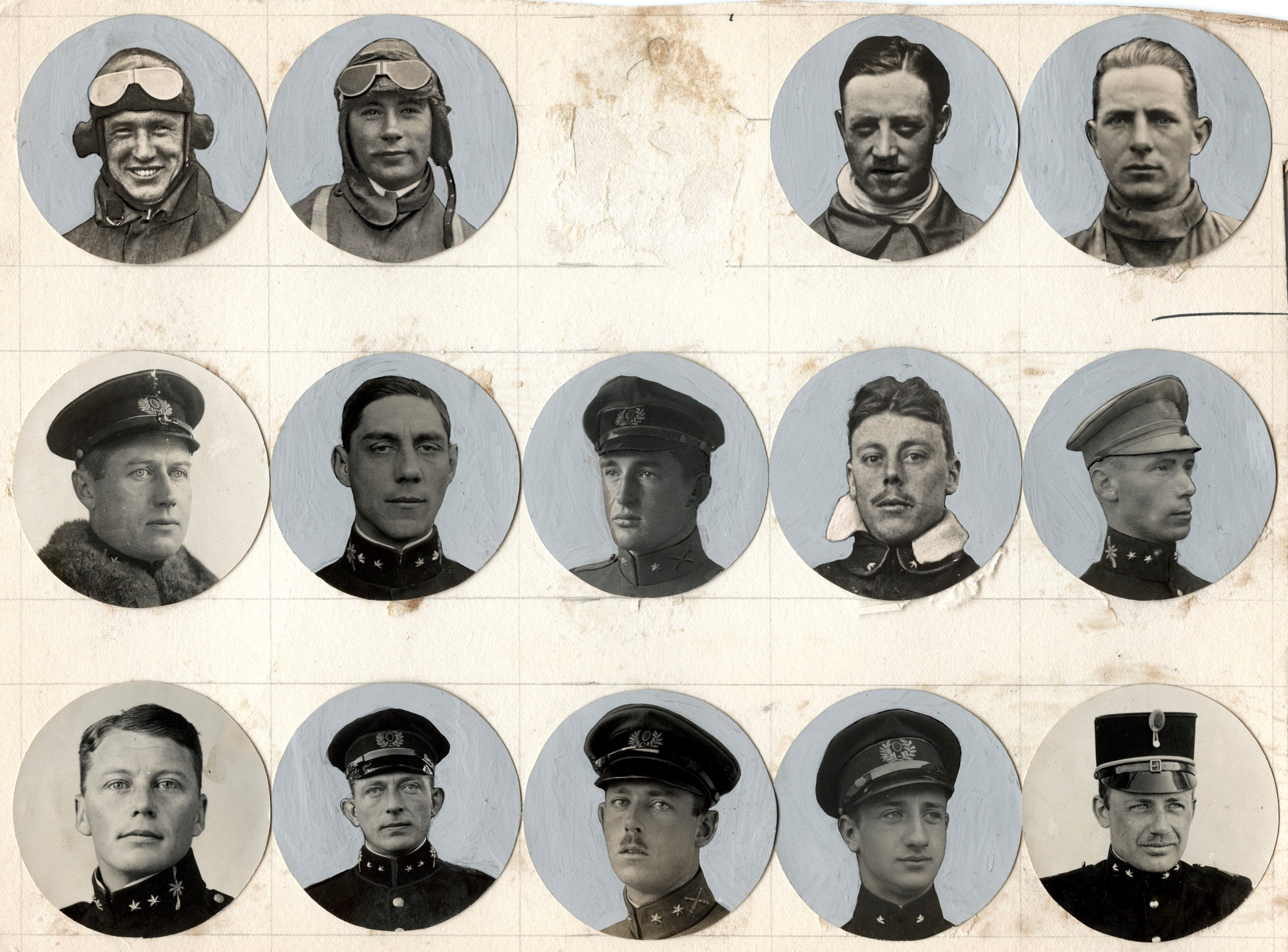
- Koppen (bottom row, 2nd from the right) among Dutch aviators
- Born: George Alexander Koppen; 21 June 1890; Nijmegen, Netherlands
- Died: 1 January 1970 (aged 79); Haarlem, Netherlands
- Other name: Naps

George Alexander “Gijs” Koppen (21 June 1890 – 1 January 1970) was a Dutch military officer and pilot. He is most known as and aviation pioneer flying in 1927 the first return mail flight from Amsterdam to Batavia in a record time, laying the foundation for a postal service between the Netherlands and the Dutch East Indies, the largest postal connection in the world for years.

== Biography ==
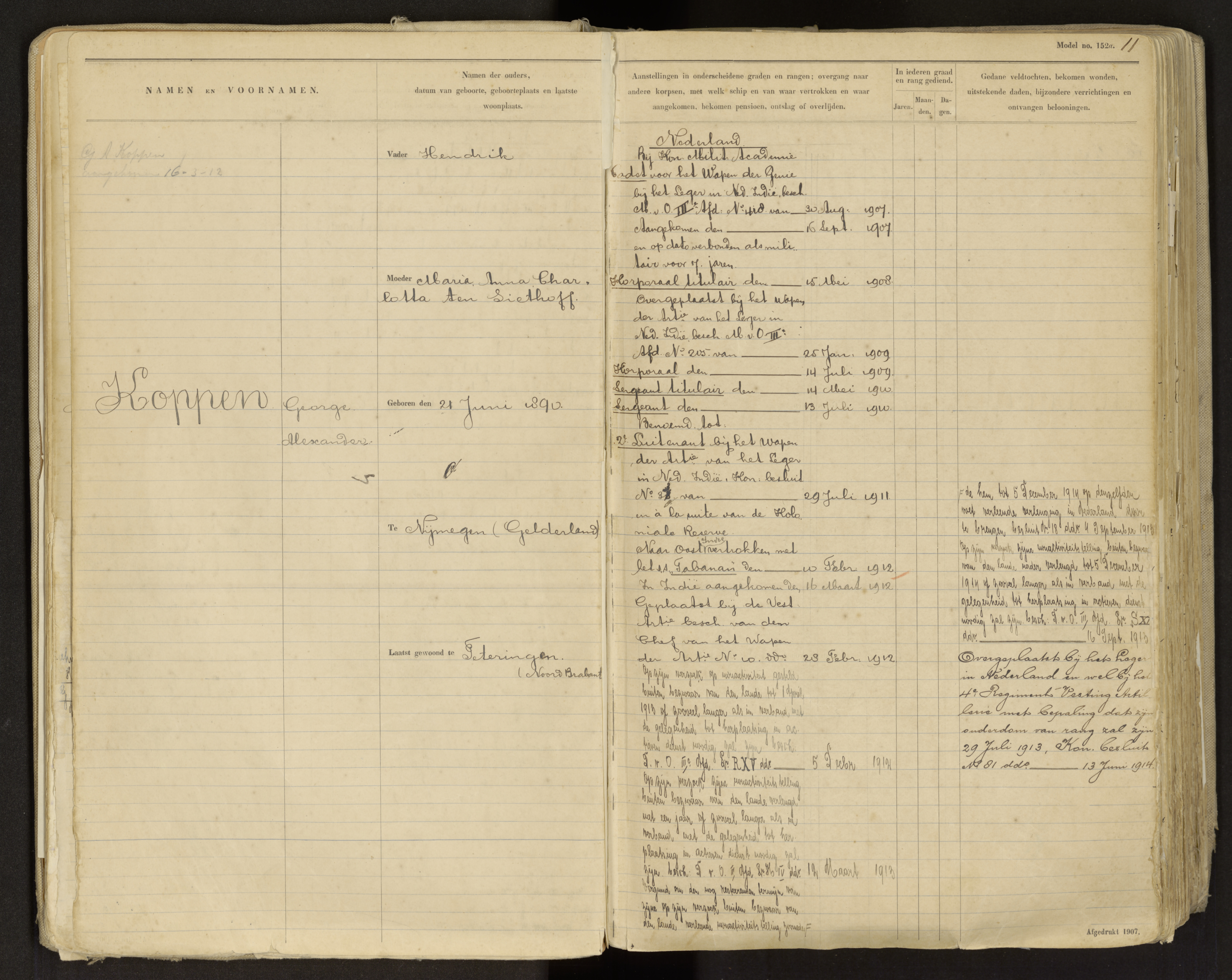
Royal Netherlands East Indies Army record of Koppen

Koppen was born on 21 June 1890 in Nijmegen. After studying at the HBS in Breda he went to the Koninklijke Militaire Academie. He became officer of the Royal Netherlands East Indies Army.

After serving for a short time in the Dutch East Indies, he was seconded to the Aviation Department at Soesterberg Air Base where he earned the FAI pilot license number 13 in December 1914. During World War I he was able to fly various German, English and French manufactured aircraft, which were "lost" above the neutral Netherlands and were confiscated. He became a flight instructor in 1918. In 1920, after World War I, he wanted to realize the first flight to the Dutch East Indies with a German Albatros C XV. However the English authorities stopped this, because they didn’t allow a German plane flying over Mesopotamia. In 1925 he was for a certain time test pilot at Fokker.

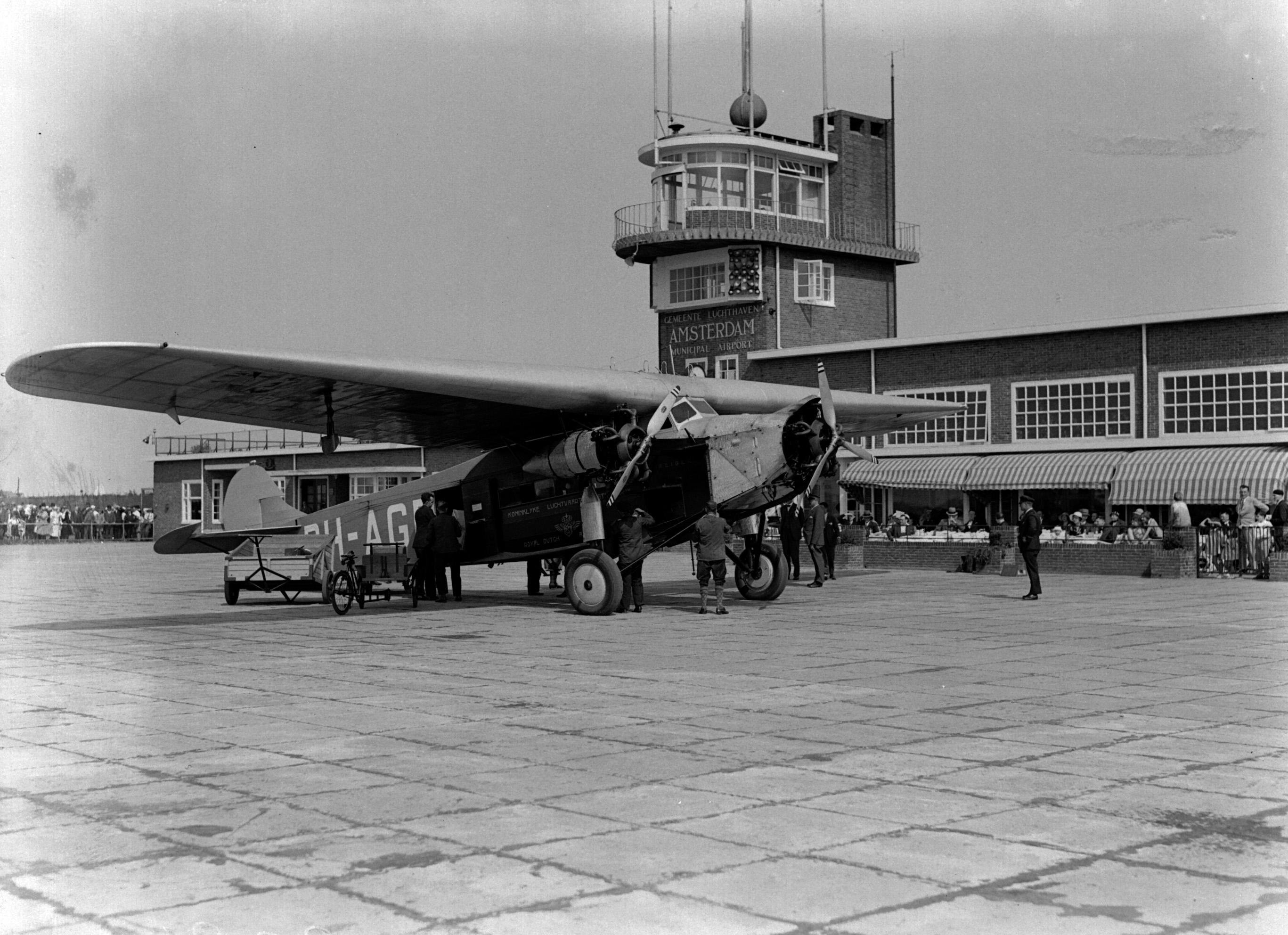
Similar Fokker F.VII as used the first return mail flight from Amsterdam to Batavia

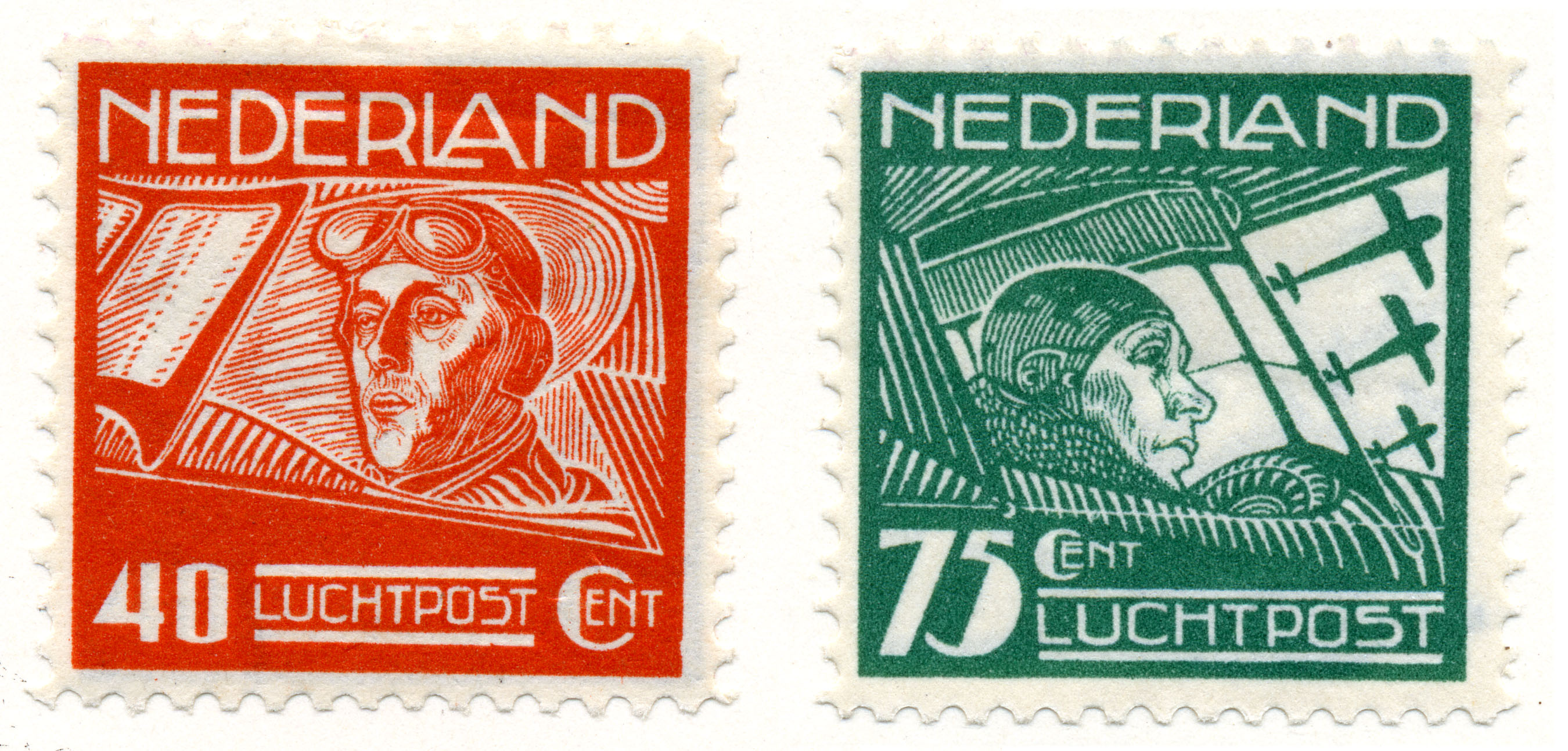
Koppen (left) depicted on one of the two 1928 Dutch aviation stamps. According to Koppen, the resemblance to himself is not very good.

On 1 October 1927, as captain of "de Postduif", the three-engine Fokker F.VII “H-NAEA”, he departed to Batavia to explore if mail flight connection between Amsterdam and Batavia would be possible. After a fuel problem in Iran, he arrived in Batavia nine days later. The return flight took longer: eleven days, also because it took one day to repair a broken landing gear. After returning a month after his departure in the Netherlands he received many congratulations for this records and had become a known man. While he wasn’t the first person to fly to the Dutch East Indies, with the return flight, he laid the foundation for a postal service between the Netherlands and the Dutch East Indies, which for years was the largest in the world.

Between 1928 and 1934 he was chief flight service of the KNILM in Batavia. In 1935 he was a member of the Mimika-expeditie in New Guinea. In 1937 he returned to the Netherlands, where he was assigned to the third aviation regiment. In 1939 he became commander at the first aviation group. From May 1945 until his retirement in 1948 he was commander at Soesterberg Air Base.

Koppen received the Order of Orange-Nassau.

Koppen died in Haarlem on 1 January 1970 at the age of 79. His cremation took place in a private circle.

A book was published about his life and career entitled “Waag veel, riskeer niets! G.A. Koppen (1890–1970) en de vlucht van de Postduif”.
