= Alzheimer's Research & Therapy =

- Discipline: Alzheimer's disease, neurology
- Language: English
- Edited by: Delphine Boche, Miia Kivipelto, Charlotte Teunissen

Publication details
- History: 2009-present
- Publisher: BioMed Central
- Frequency: Continuous
- Open access: Yes
- License: Creative Commons Attribution License 4.0
- Impact factor: 8.0 (2023)

Standard abbreviations
- ISO 4: Alzheimer's Res. Ther.

Indexing
- CODEN: ARTLCD
- ISSN: 1758-9193
- LCCN: 2009243541
- OCLC no.: 427406256

Links
- Journal homepage; Online archive

Alzheimer's Research & Therapy is a peer-reviewed open-access medical journal covering research on Alzheimer's disease. It is affiliated with (Alzheimer's Research UK). It was established in 2009 and is published by BioMed Central. It publishes basic research as well as clinical trials, research into drug discovery and development, and epidemiologic studies. The editors-in-chief are Delphine Boche (University of Southampton), Miia Kivipelto (Karolinska Institute), and Charlotte Teunissen (Amsterdam University Medical Center).

== Abstracting and indexing ==
The journal is abstracted and indexed in Chemical Abstracts Service, Embase, Science Citation Index Expanded, and Scopus. According to the Journal Citation Reports the 2023 impact factor is 8.0.
