= Barend Joseph Stokvis =

Physician and professor of physiology

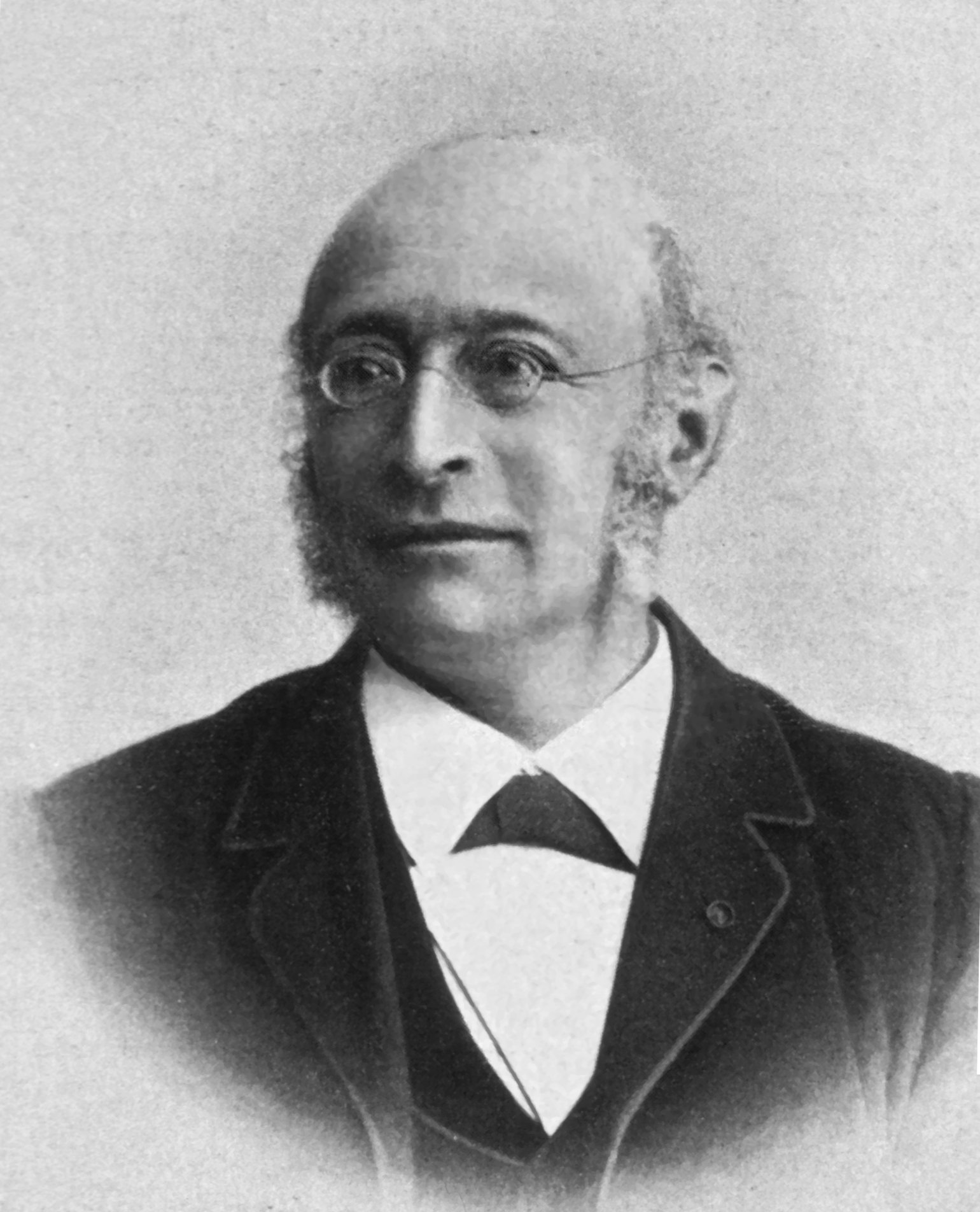
- Photograph of Barend Joseph Stokvis published in the 1890s
- Born: 16 August 1834; Amsterdam, Netherlands
- Died: 29 September 1902 (aged 68); Amsterdam, Netherlands
- Education: University of Amsterdam; University of Utrecht
- Scientific career
- Fields: Chemical pathology; Tropical medicine
- Workplaces: University of Amsterdam

Barend Joseph Stokvis (Dutch pronunciation: [ˈbaːrəɲ ˈtɕoːsəf ˈstɔkfɪs]; 16 August 1834 – 29 September 1902) was a physician and professor of physiology and pharmacology at the University of Amsterdam. He is mainly remembered for his description of acute porphyria in 1889. As a researcher in chemical pathology he made contributions to the understanding of a number of diseases, such as diabetes. He was also considered an expert in tropical medicine and a celebrated medical educator. He authored an influential pharmacology textbook. Stokvis was one of a number of prominent 19th-century Jewish physicians in the Netherlands.

== Early life and education ==
Stokvis was born to Rachel Wittering and Joseph Barend Stokvis, Jr., a Jewish physician and obstetrician in Amsterdam. He studied medicine in Amsterdam and at the University of Utrecht under Franciscus Donders and Jacobus Schroeder van der Kolk, obtaining a doctorate on a dissertation on hepatic glucose production in diabetes in 1856. His thesis appeared shortly after the publication of related work by the French physiologist Claude Bernard. Stokvis may also have been influenced by the chemist Gerardus Mulder in Amsterdam. Subsequently, he travelled to Paris and Vienna (and possibly Prague), before establishing himself in medical practice in Amsterdam. He continued his medical research under the physiologists Adriaan Heynsius, Wilhelm Kühne and Thomas Place. In 1867, the Brussels Academy awarded a gold medal to Stokvis for an essay on the development of albuminuria, a kidney disorder in which the protein albumin can be detected in the urine.

== Scientific career ==
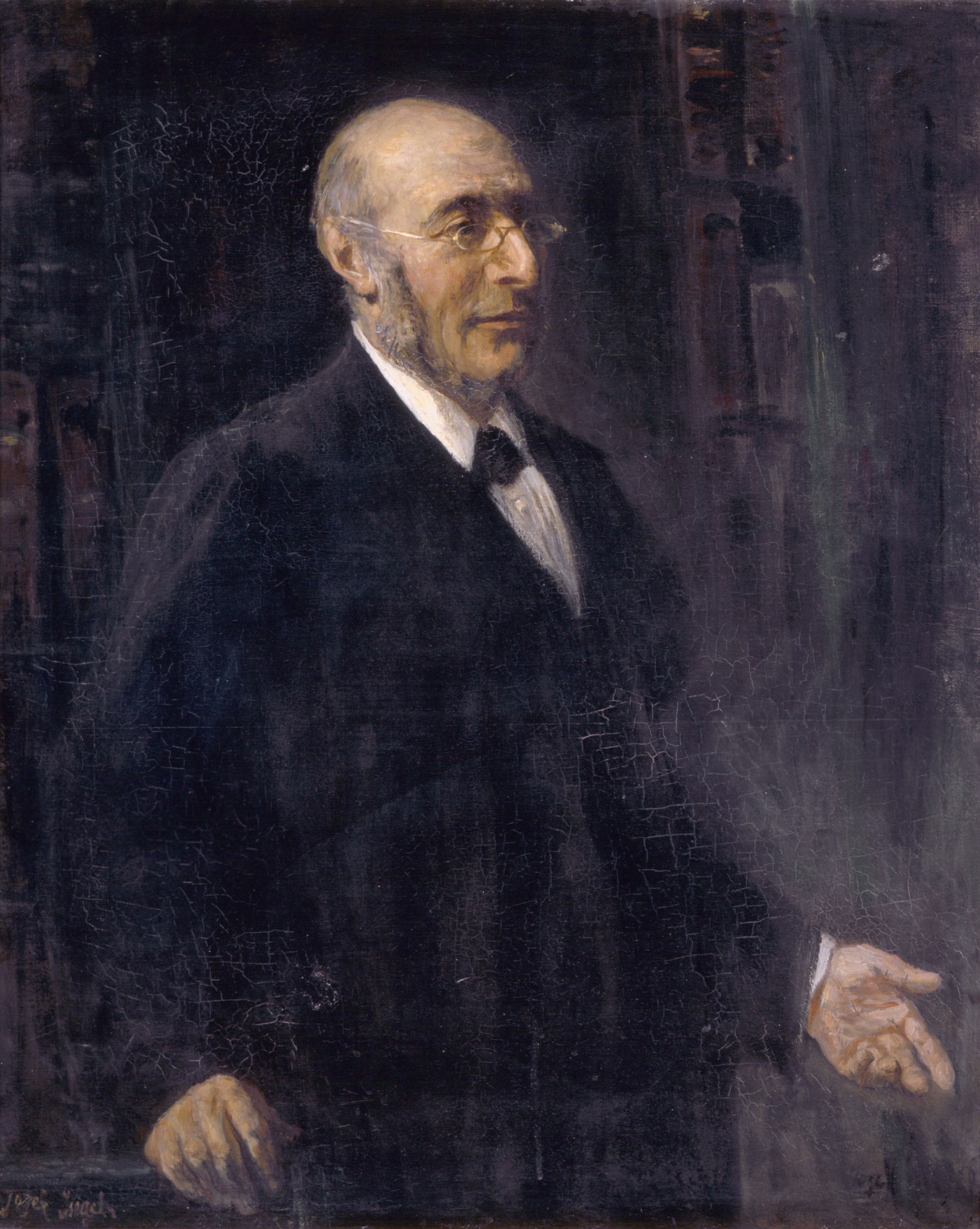
Portrait of B. J. Stokvis (1899) by Jozef Israëls

In 1874 he was appointed as lecturer in medicine at the Athenaeum Illustre in medicine, pathology and pharmacodynamics, and became a professor when the Athenaeum received university status and became the Municipal University of Amsterdam. He served as rector magnificus (dean) of the university in the 1880s.

His prolific output, mainly in chemical pathology, included research into the metabolism of glycogen, uric acid, and urea; studies into an epidemic of cholera in Amsterdam; the toxicity of Atropa belladonna (deadly nightshade); various pigmented substances in the blood (including porphyrins); the nature of the heart sounds; and several contributions in tropical medicine, in which he was considered an expert. He also described the blood disorder methaemoglobinaemia.

In 1889, he reported on a case of acute illness provoked by the newly introduced hypnotic drug sulfonmethane, also known as sulfonal. Stokvis observed the unusual dark red urine, discovered that it contained porphyrins, and coined the name "porphyria" for the condition. The patient's underlying condition was probably acute intermittent porphyria, which can be provoked by medicines. Similar reports by others followed shortly after, and it was soon found that other drugs could also induce porphyria attacks. The Swedish chemist Olof Hammarsten further analysed red compound found in the urine of the patients with sulfonal-related porphyria attacks, labeling it "haematoporphyrin". Porphyrins were first identified by the German chemist Felix Hoppe-Seyler in 1871, and derive their named from the Greek for purple—poxphuros—after to their purple color.

Stokvis' most important work was judged by his contemporaries to be his three-volume "Voordrachten over Geneesmiddelenleer" ("Speeches on Pharmacology", soon translated into the French "Leçons de Pharmacotherapie"), which appeared shortly before his death.

== Other activities ==
Stokvis was close to the influential German pathologist Rudolf Virchow. In 1879 Stokvis was elected a member of the Royal Netherlands Academy of Arts and Sciences, and he served as vice-president of the Academy in 1896. He was awarded received an honorary Doctorate of Laws by the University of Edinburgh in 1884. Stokvis also chaired the 1883 International Colonial Medicine Congress in Amsterdam. He was one of the founders (in 1896) of Janus, an international journal for the history of medicine. He is regarded as an illustrious member of Holland's medical dynasty, and as a pioneer in the fields of chemical physiology and chemotherapy. Together with Samuel Siegmund Rosenstein, professor of medicine in Leiden, he was a supporter of Aletta Jacobs, the first woman to qualify as a doctor in the Netherlands.

In addition to his medical work, Stokvis also succeeded his father as president of the charitable Jewish Poor Board (Nederlandsch Israëlitisch Armbestuur), was a member-founder of the Dutch Jewish Institute for the Insane, and a board member of the Jewish Institute for the Aged and the Amsterdam Jewish Hospital (Centraal Israëlitische Ziekenverpleging). He was also a patron of the arts.

== Personal life ==
In 1865 he married Julia Elisabeth, the sister of his close friend, the banker and philanthropist A.C. Wertheim. They had two children. He was an ardent swimmer, and wrote poetry under several pseudonyms. He spoke several languages. He died in Amsterdam shortly after returning from a holiday in Ireland, from what was thought to be myocarditis.
