= Wouter Snijders =

Dutch judge and legal scholar (1928–2020)

Vice President of the Supreme Court of the Netherlands
- In office 28 February 1986 – 1 June 1998

Justice of the Supreme Court of the Netherlands
- In office 17 July 1970 – 28 February 1986

Personal details
- Born: 26 May 1928 Hilversum, Netherlands
- Died: 21 July 2020 (aged 92) The Hague, Netherlands
- Education: University of Amsterdam

Wouter Snijders (26 May 1928 – 21 July 2020) was a Dutch judge and legal scholar. He was justice on the Supreme Court of the Netherlands between 1970 and 1986 and served as vice president from 1986 to 1998. Snijders also served as chair of the Court's civil chamber. He was the government's commissioner for the introduction of the new Burgerlijk Wetboek between 1971 and 1995. Snijders is credited as being one of the most influential civil law scholars of the Netherlands.

== Career ==
Snijders was born on 26 May 1928 in Hilversum. He started studying medicine, but did not like having to wake up early for classes. He subsequently contemplated studying history, but his previous education did not give him the needed qualifications and he thus decided to study law. Snijders remained an uninterested student, only being inspired by professor Marcel Henri Bregstein. He graduated with a law degree from the University of Amsterdam in 1953. During his studies he performed his military service for 1.5 years in the Dutch East Indies. Snijders became a lawyer and later a judge in Rotterdam. From this latter position he was detached to the Ministry of Justice in 1965, to start working on a new civil code of the Netherlands.

On 17 July 1970 he was appointed to the Supreme Court of the Netherlands, but only took up the work associated with the position in September 1976, due to his work on the new civil code. In the 1980s he became chair of the civil chamber of the Supreme Court. On 28 February 1986 he became vice president of the court. Although being offered the position of president of the court twice, he declined each time. He retired on 1 June 1998. From 2000 to 2002 he was a professor in extraordinary service at the University of Amsterdam, with a teaching assignment in private law.

In 1971 Snijders was appointed government's commissioner for the books 3,5 and 6 of the new Burgerlijk Wetboek (Dutch Civil Law Code), dealing with property law and the law of obligations. In 1995, three years after the introduction of the new Burgerlijk Wetboek, Snijders laid down his position as government's commissioner.

Due to the combination of being chair of the civil chamber of the Supreme Court and the position as government's commissioner for the new civil law code, German law scholar Wolfgang Ernst called Snijders: "the most powerful and influential (Dutch) lawyer in civil law matters for nearly two decades". Snijders is regarded as having strengthened the Dutch judicial liability system, together with Auke Bloembergen. During the 1990s he helped Russian colleagues with the rewriting of the Civil Code of Russia.

Snijders was elected member of the Royal Netherlands Academy of Arts and Sciences in 1979. He received an honorary doctorate from Leiden University in 1980.

He died on 21 July 2020 in The Hague.
