= Jacobus Schroeder van der Kolk =

Dutch physician and professor of physiology (1797–1862)

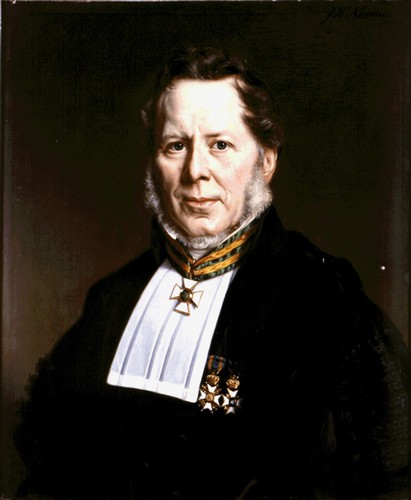
Painting of Jacobus Schroeder van der Kolk

Jacobus Ludovicus Conradus Schroeder van der Kolk (Leeuwarden, 14 April 1797 – Utrecht, 1 May 1862) was a Dutch anatomist and physiologist and an influential researcher into the causes of epilepsy and mental illness.

Schroeder van der Kolk's father's surname was Van der Kolk, but he added his mother's maiden name "Schroeder" when her line threatened to die out. He studied medicine at the University of Groningen, where he graduated in 1820. He then practiced medicine in Hoorn and was soon after appointed at the Amsterdam Buitengasthuis hospital. Here Schroeder van der Kolk was influenced by the ideas of Claude François Lallemand and developed his ideas with regard to the etiology of mental illness, particularly the concept that mental illness is a disease than can be treated. He was appointed professor of anatomy and physiology at the University of Utrecht in 1826, where he taught gross anatomy and microscopic anatomy. In Utrecht, Schroeder van der Kolk's pupils included Franciscus Donders, Hermann Snellen and Barend Joseph Stokvis.

He published over 100 papers on various medical topics. In 1859 he delivered the Sydenham lecture at the Worshipful Society of Apothecaries in London.

Schroeder van der Kolk's best known work is on the pathogenesis of epilepsy. Autopsy studies on the brains of people who had suffered of epilepsy in life showed changes in the medulla oblongata (part of the brainstem), and Schroeder van der Kolk stated that seizures must therefore originate in this area. Several decades later it was discovered that seizures arise from the cerebral cortex. He conducted other studies in neuroanatomy, such as into the organisation of the spinal cord.

Other important work was in the nature and causes of mental illness. Apart from Lallemand he was also influenced by the French psychiatrists Philippe Pinel and Jean-Étienne Dominique Esquirol. His work in this area led to him being appointed general inspector for psychiatric institutions.

Schroeder van der Kolk married twice, first to Cornelia Templeman and after being widowed of her to Geertruid Elizabeth Schroeder, whose father was professor of mathematics in Utrecht. He had one child from the first and five from the second marriage.

Schroeder van der Kolk became a correspondent of the Royal Institute in 1831 and was admitted as member in 1846. When the Royal Institute became the Royal Netherlands Academy of Arts and Sciences in 1855 he became a member.
