= Megaliths in the Netherlands =

Structures made of large upright stones

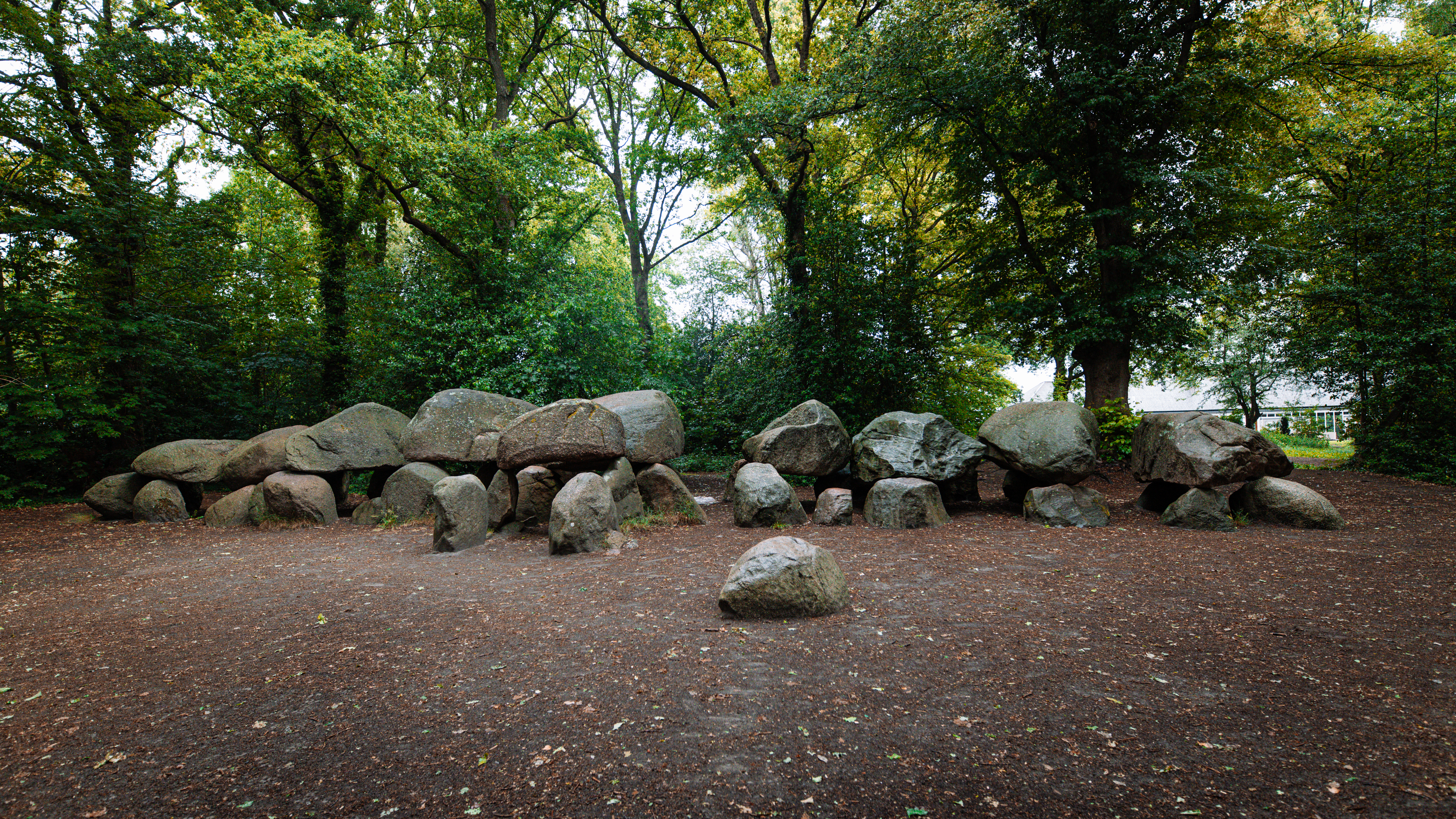
The Borger megalithic tomb (D27) has the longest burial chamber of all megalithic sites in the Netherlands. It is also the first in which a documented excavation took place.

Megalithic architecture appeared in what is now the Netherlands during the Neolithic period, especially in the northeast. Megalithic structures, i.e. buildings made of large upright stones, occur in various forms and functions, mainly as burial sites, temples or menhirs (stones standing alone or in a formation). In the Netherlands, only burial complexes are known. These large stone tombs (Dutch: Hunebedden) were built between 3470 and 3250 BC by members of the Western Group of the Funnelbeaker culture (TBK) and were used until about 2760 BC. After the end of the Funnelbeaker culture in the Late Neolithic, the sites were reused by the Single Grave culture and the Bell Beaker culture during the ensuing Early Bronze Age and, to a lesser extent, into the Middle Ages.

Distribution of megalithic tombs in the Netherlands:
preserved; destroyed; questionable attribution

Of the original 100 megalithic tombs in the Netherlands, 54 are still preserved today. Of these, 52 are located in the province of Drenthe. Two more are in the province of Groningen, one of which has been turned into a museum. There is also a site in the province of Utrecht whose classification as a megalithic tomb is uncertain. Destroyed megalithic tombs are also known from the province of Overijssel. Most of the surviving tombs are concentrated on the Hondsrug ridge between the cities of Groningen and Emmen.

The tombs attracted the interest of researchers early on. The first paper was published in 1547. A book published in 1660 by Johan Picardt, who believed that the tombs were the constructions of giants, was widely read. Titia Brongersma carried out the first known excavation of a Dutch megalithic tomb in 1685. In 1734, the first law was passed to protect the tombs, followed by others in the 18th and 19th centuries. In 1846, Leonhardt Johannes Friedrich Janssen published the first nearly complete inventory of the tombs. In 1878, William Collings Lukis and Henry Dryden made the most accurate plans to date of many of the graves. Modern archaeological research on the megalithic tombs was initiated in 1912 by Jan Hendrik Holwerda, who completely excavated two sites. Shortly thereafter, Albert Egges van Giffen began further research. He measured all the sites, carried out numerous other excavations, and had almost all the graves restored by the 1950s. Van Giffen also developed a numbering system for the megalithic tombs that is still used today, with a capital letter for the province and a number ascending from north to south (and a lowercase letter for destroyed sites). Since 1967, there has been a museum in Borger dedicated exclusively to the megalithic tombs and their builders.

The chambers of the tombs were built of granite boulders deposited in the Netherlands during the Ice Age. The gaps between the stones were filled with dry stone made of small stone slabs. The chambers were then covered with earth. Some of the mounds also have a stone fence. Depending on whether the entrance to the chamber is on a long or narrow side, the graves are called dolmens or passage graves. Almost all sites in the Netherlands are passage graves, only one is a dolmen. The graves are similar in their basic structure but vary greatly in size. The length of the chamber ranges from 2.5 m to 20 m. Small chambers were built in all phases of construction, while larger ones were added only in later phases.

Due to the unfavorable preservation conditions, only small amounts of human bones were recovered from the graves. These were mainly cremated remains. Only very limited information is available on the age and sex of the deceased.

In contrast, the grave goods were exceedingly rich. In some graves, thousands of pottery shards were discovered, which could often be reconstructed into hundreds of vessels. Other grave goods included stone tools, jewelry in the form of beads and pendants, animal bones, and, in rare cases, bronze objects. The diverse array of vessel forms and decorations permitted the identification of multiple typological levels, thereby enabling insights to be gleaned about the construction and utilization history of the graves.

== Research history ==
=== Early research (16th-18th century) ===
The modern study of the Dutch megalithic tombs commenced in 1547 with Anthonius Schonhovius Batavus (Antony van Schoonhove), canon of the St. Donatian's Cathedral in Bruges. In a manuscript, he referenced a passage in Tacitus' Germania in which "Pillars of Heracles" are mentioned in the land of the Frisians. Schonhovius equated these with one of the tombs near Rolde and mixed Tacitus' text with local legends. He assumed that the building material was brought here by demons who were worshipped under the name of Heracles. He also believed that the tombs were altars on which human sacrifices were performed. His text was subsequently adopted by numerous other scholars over the following decades, with the Pillars of Heracles or the "Duvels Kut" ("Devil's Cunt", another name used for the grave near Rolde according to Schonhovius) being recorded on several maps between 1568 and 1636.

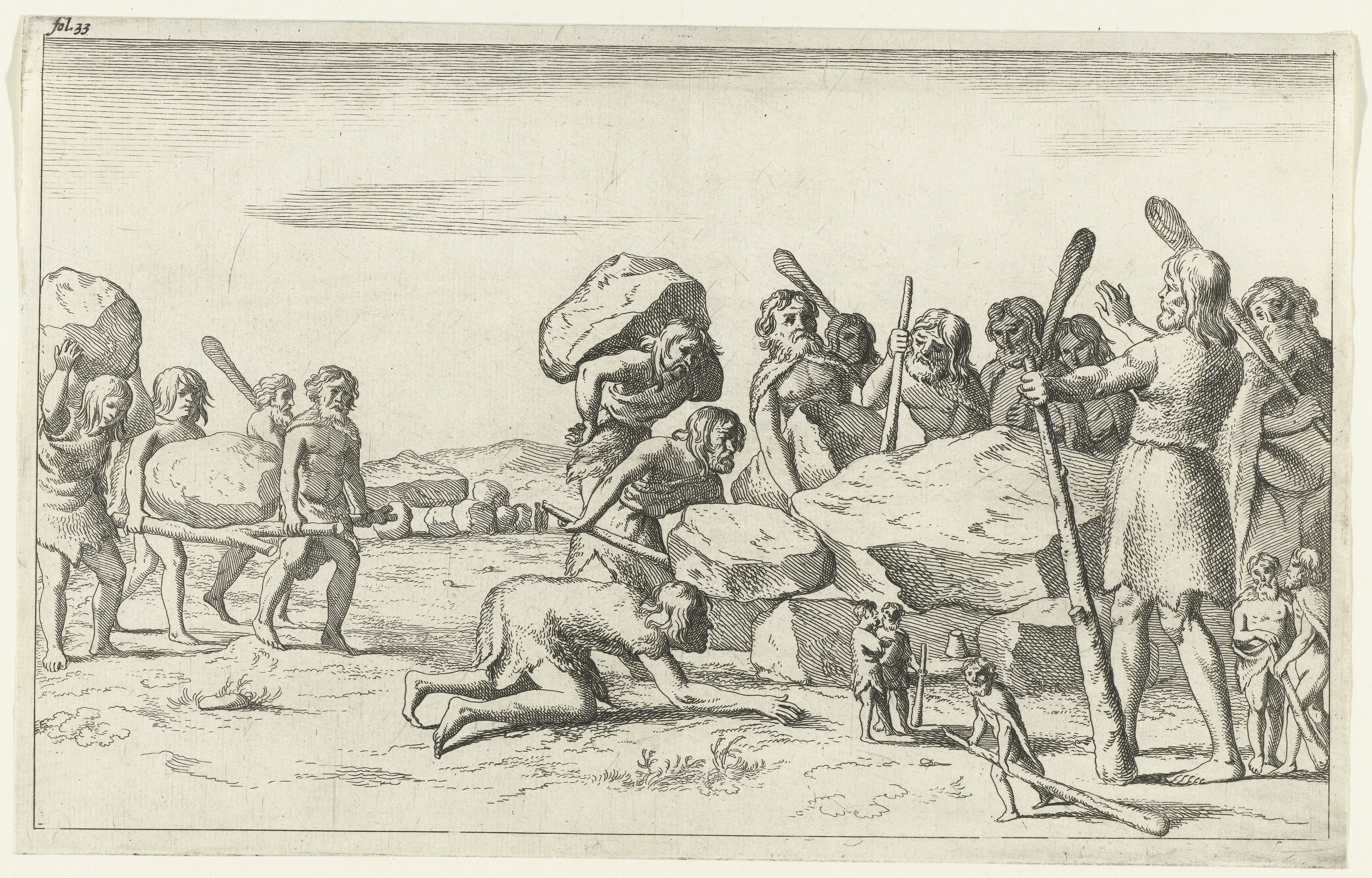
Illustration of Picardt's idea that the megalithic tombs were built by giants

It was more than a hundred years before anyone wrote about the Dutch megalithic tombs who had seen them. Johan Picardt, a native of Bentheim, worked as a pastor in Rolde and Coevorden, among other places, and was also responsible for the colonization of the bogs in the border region between Bentheim and Drenthe. In 1660, he published a three-part work on the antiquities of the Netherlands, particularly the province of Drenthe and the town of Coevorden. Picardt's views were strongly influenced by biblical stories. For example, he hypothesized that the megalithic tombs were built by giants who had migrated to Drenthe from the Holy Land via Scandinavia. This view became widespread, not least because of the impressive illustrations in Picardt's book. At the same time, before and during Picardt's lifetime, there were other (mainly German) researchers who rejected this idea and attributed the construction of the tombs to ordinary people. Picardt was also the first to provide detailed descriptions of the structure of the tombs and to mention ceramic vessels as burial objects.

The lawyer and historian Simon van Leeuwen also visited the megalithic tombs in the province of Drenthe a few years after Picardt and dedicated a section to them in his work Batavia Illustrata, published posthumously in 1685. Van Leeuwen also considered the possibility of giants as builders, but thought more of tall Cimbri and Celts.

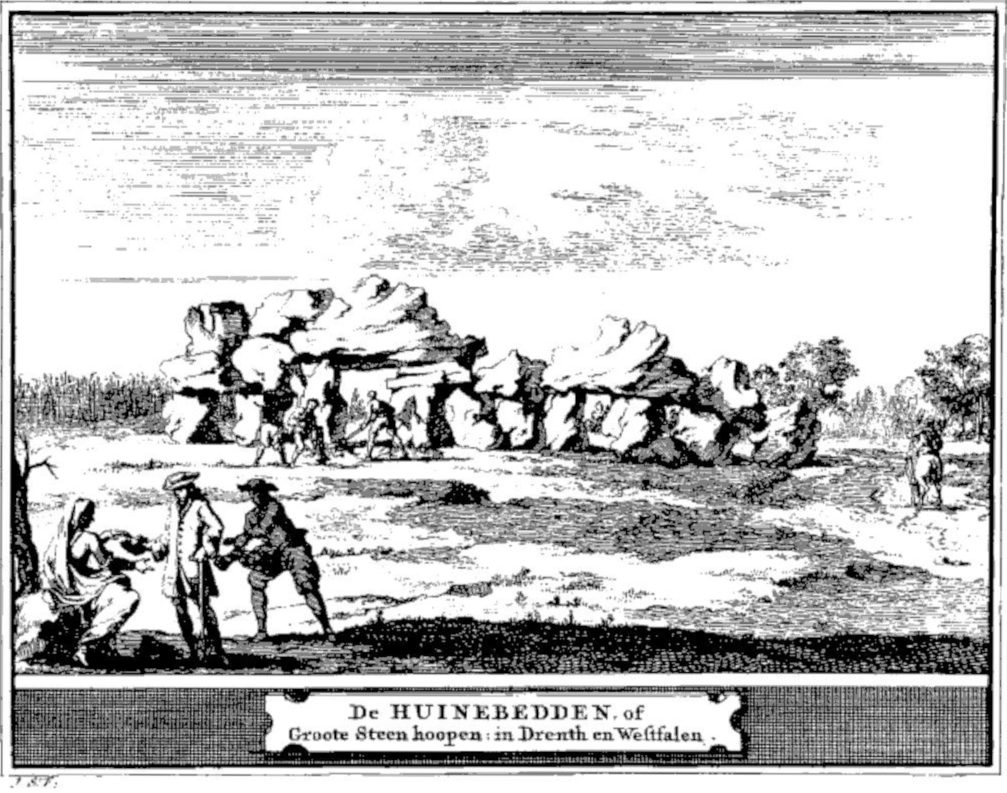
Depiction of the excavation of the megalithic tomb near Borger by Titia Brongersma in Ludolph Smid's Schatkamer der Nederlandse oudheden (1711)

Titia Brongersma, a poet from Dokkum, conducted the inaugural known excavation of a megalithic tomb in the Netherlands in 1685. In collaboration with her cousin Jan Laurens Lentinck, the Schultheiß of Borger, she spearheaded the investigation of the Borger megalithic tomb (D27). Brongersma herself only published two poems about it, from which it emerges that she believed the grave was a temple dedicated to nature. However, she discussed this intensively with her friend Ludolph Smids, a doctor and poet from Groningen. Smids initially wrote a poem about the excavation. He published these poems in his work Poëzije in 1694 and also added a more detailed description of the finds and discoveries from the grave. Smids' publication of the excavation in Borger and his correspondence with Christian Schlegel led to the idea of giants as the builders of the megalithic tombs being increasingly rejected. However, Smids himself revised his views again after his conversion from Catholicism to Calvinism and again took up Picardt's views in his work Schatkamer der Nederlandse oudheden, published in 1711.

In 1706, Johannes Hofstede and Abraham Rudolph Kymmel conducted another excavation at a large stone tomb in Rolde (D17). In his report, Hofstede described the different layers within the site and the stratigraphic position of the pottery found. Unfortunately, the report did not influence Hofstede's contemporaries, as it was not published until 1848.

In the 1730s, new levees were constructed in significant portions of the Netherlands and northwest Germany, replacing the previous ones, which were based on wooden structures that had been damaged by imported shipworms. The new dikes consisted of stone-covered earth mounds, which is why erratic blocks became a highly sought-after building material. The unregulated search for erratic blocks also led to the removal of boundary stones. This prompted the government of Drenthe to issue a resolution on July 21, 1734, prohibiting such actions. At the same time, this resolution placed the megalithic tombs under protection. After two royal decrees in Denmark (1620) and Sweden (1630), this was the third law to protect antiquities in Europe.

In 1732, the affluent Amsterdam textile merchant Andries Schoemaker undertook a journey to Drenthe with the draughtsman Cornelis Pronk and his apprentice Abraham de Haen. This excursion resulted in the initial realistic depictions of the two megalithic tombs situated in the vicinity of Havelte (D53 and D54). Schoemaker also furnished a comprehensive account of the sites. Both draughtsmen subsequently returned to Drenthe. Two surviving drawings by Abraham de Haen of the megalithic tomb D53 from 1737 and one by Cornelis Pronk of the megalithic tomb Midlaren (D3) from 1754 provide insight into the evolution of these structures.

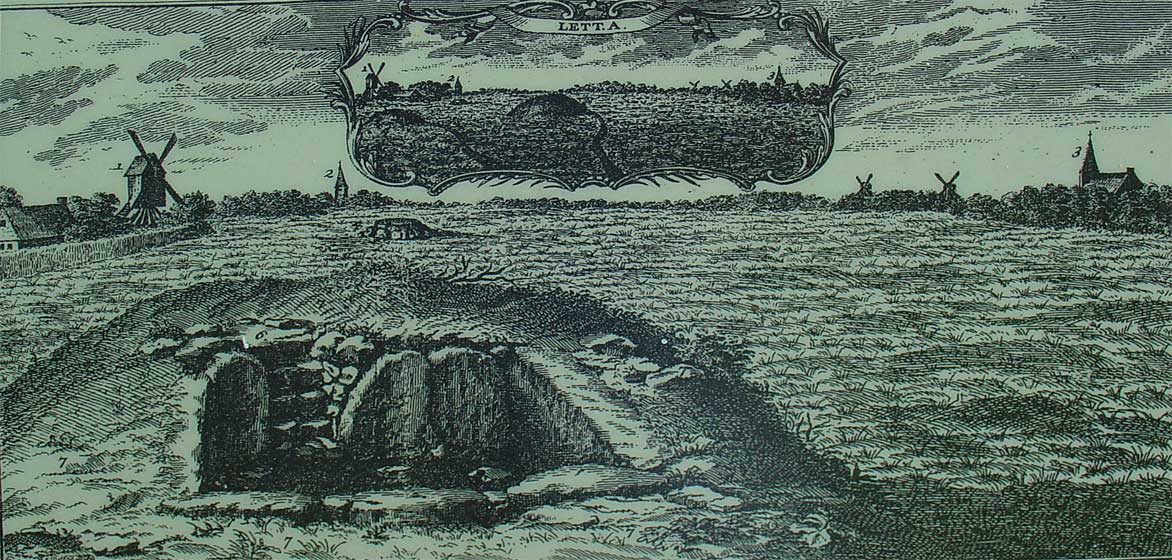
Drawing of the Eext megalithic tomb at the time of restoration by Joannes van Lier

In 1756, Joannes van Lier was commissioned to restore the Eext megalithic tomb (D13). This site, which had been dug into the ground, had been discovered around 20 years earlier by a stone hunter and was also rediscovered by stone hunters in 1756. The vessels and axes found were sold to collectors. Two capstones were also removed. Van Lier conducted a comprehensive examination of the site and endeavored to restore the burial chamber to its original condition to the best of his ability. Just two days later, he published a newspaper article about his work. Shortly thereafter, Cornelis van Noorde created a drawing of the tomb. Henrik Cannegieter, the principal of the Latin school in Arnhem, authored a treatise on the tomb based on the newspaper article, despite having neither seen it himself nor contacted van Lier. At the suggestion of his friend Arnout Vosmaer, van Lier undertook a critical examination of this treatise in five lengthy letters. These letters ultimately resulted in the first monographic treatise on a Dutch megalithic tomb, which was published by Vosmaer in 1760.

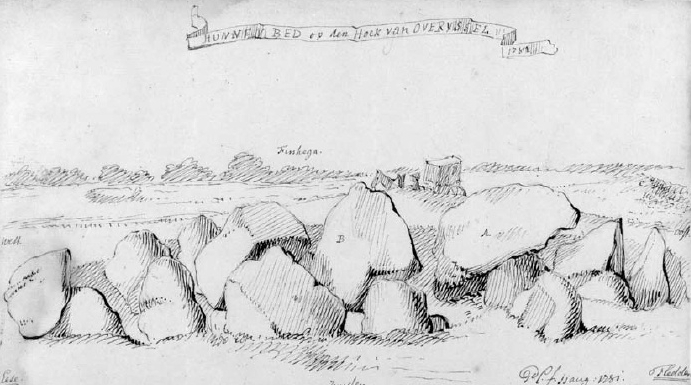
Drawing of the Steenwijkerwold megalithic tomb by Petrus Camper (1781)

Between 1768 and 1781, Petrus Camper created drawings of eight megalithic tombs. Among these was the Steenwijkerwold megalithic tomb (O1), which was destroyed in the 19th century.

In 1774, Theodorus van Brussel published a new edition of Ludolf Smids' Schatkamer der Nederlandse oudheden, which he augmented with extensive notes of his own. In this edition, van Brussel (who was unaware of van Lier's work) advanced the thesis that the megalithic tombs were natural formations that had formed on the seabed. He further postulated that, after the land had dried up, erosion had given them their present appearance.

In 1790, Engelbertus Matthias Engelberts published the third volume of his historical work De Aloude Staat En Geschiedenissen Der Vereenigde Nederlanden, which was aimed at a general audience. In it, he devoted himself in detail to the megalithic tombs and summarized the state of research at the time quite completely. He also added two (rather inaccurate) drawings of the Tynaarlo megalithic tomb (D6) to his text. It is also noteworthy that Engelberts observed that the flat side of the capstones in the tombs always faced downward. Consequently, he rejected the hypothesis that the structures had served as altars.

In 1790, the resolution to protect the megalithic tombs was renewed. In 1809, the Landdrost of Drenthe, Petrus Hofstede, once again prohibited the removal of stones from the graves and the digging of mounds. In 1818/19, the local authorities were obliged to closely monitor compliance with this law and to draw up annual reports.

=== 19th century ===
In 1808, the Koninklijke Hollandsche Maatschappij der Wetenschappen, an academic society established by Adriaan Giles Camper, son of Petrus Camper, initiated a competition with the objective of elucidating the ethnic identity of the builders of the megalithic tombs.

In April 1809, the Emmen-Noord megalithic tomb (D41), which had previously been completely covered, was uncovered and examined. Johannes Hofstede, the brother of Petrus Hofstede, wrote a detailed report on this. His brother then obtained the exclusive right to conduct excavations in the province of Drenthe. Subsequently, he conducted further investigations at four additional megalithic tombs. However, the results of these excavations were not fully documented.

Nicolaus Westendorp made further important contributions to research at the beginning of the 19th century. In 1811, he visited the megalithic tombs in Drenthe and seven others in Germany. He wrote an extensive treatise, with which he finally won the competition announced in 1808. Westendorp described a distribution area of megalithic sites stretching from Portugal to Scandinavia. He assumed a common origin for all these sites. He adopted the observation made by van Lier that the megalithic tombs only contained stone tools. On this basis, Westendorp argued for a two-period system consisting of a Stone Age and a subsequent Metal Age. The Danish researcher Christian Jürgensen Thomsen was strongly influenced by his work in the development of his Three-age system. Westendorp compared the inventories of the megalithic tombs with the material remains of several ancient peoples and excluded most of them due to their use of metal tools. As it was implausible for him to attribute them to a previously unknown people, he argued for early Celts as the builders. He first published his theories as an essay in 1815 and then as a monograph in 1822. Westendorp's work attracted considerable attention, but also attracted criticism. For example, his hypothesis that the Celts were responsible for the megalithic tombs was called into question, given the absence of such tombs in large parts of Central and Eastern Europe, despite the presence of Celtic populations in those areas.

In the 1840s, the division of communal land was imminent. The megalithic tombs were once again in jeopardy of destruction, prompting Johan Samuel Magnin, the provincial archivist of Drenthe, to submit a petition to King William II in 1841. The petition sought to exempt prehistoric tombs from the privatization of land. However, the petition was unsuccessful. A 1842 newspaper article by Dr. Levy Ali Cohen likewise failed to effect a change in the law.

Furthermore, in the 1840s, two history books appeared that were quite popular at the time and aimed at a wide audience. These books devoted a significant amount of space to the megalithic tombs. In 1840, Johannes Pieter Arend published the first volume of his Algemeene Geschiedenis des Vaderlands. He primarily relied on the work of Engelberts and Westendorp, positing that the early Celts were the builders of the tombs. In contrast, Grozewinus Acker Stratingh advanced a novel theory in 1849, suggesting that the tombs had been constructed by unidentified ancestors of the Celts and Germanic tribes.

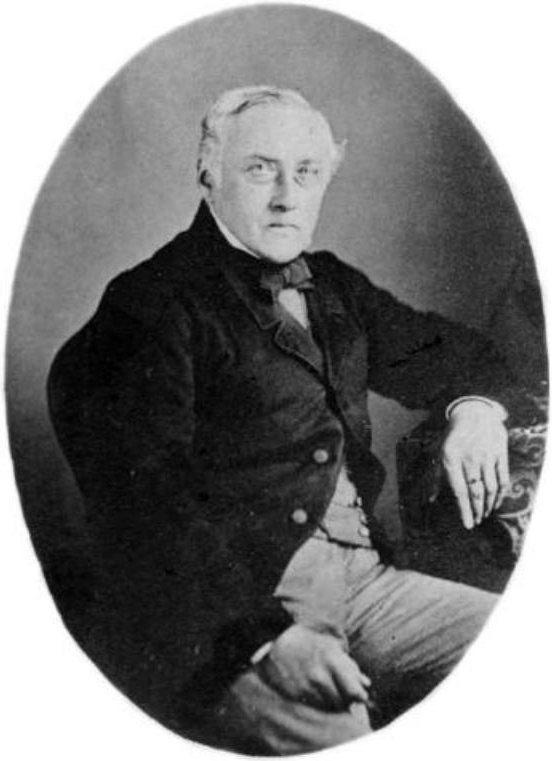
Leonhardt Johannes Friedrich Janssen

The most significant researcher of the 19th century was Leonhardt Johannes Friedrich Janssen (1806–1869), the curator of the Dutch antiquities collection at the Rijksmuseum van Oudheden in Leiden. His interest in megalithic tombs began in 1843 when he had several models of the Tynaarlo megalithic tomb (D6) made for various museums. In 1846, he excavated the Exloo-Zuiderveld stone cist (D31a) and the Zaalhof megalithic tomb (D44a). In 1847, he undertook a study of the Dutch megalithic tombs in situ and published a paper on them the following year. Janssen thus presented the first comprehensive descriptive overview of the surviving megalithic tombs in the Netherlands. In 1849, he conducted a further excavation of the stone cist remains in the Rijsterbos (F1). He subsequently devoted himself to questions regarding the construction methods of the tombs and the way of life of their builders. Janssen's most significant error was the dating of the sites to a period that was considerably more recent than it was. He described the pottery finds as "Germanic" and considered the youngest graves to be Roman. In 1853, he fell in love with the Hilversum worker Dirk Westbroek, who had faked several hearths that were supposed to be from the Stone Age. One of the sites yielded a worked sandstone slab from the Middle Ages or Modern era. Janssen dated this to the Roman period and interpreted it as evidence that the Stone Age in the Netherlands only ended with the Romans. Janssen's error had a profound impact on prehistoric research in Leiden for decades to come. It was not until 1932 that the hearth sites in Hilversum were exposed as a forgery.

The writer Willem Hofdijk was profoundly influenced by Janssen's work and produced several works between 1856 and 1859, in which he crafted a vivid portrayal of Dutch prehistory. Of particular interest is his dating of the megalithic tombs, which he placed in his work Ons Voorgeslacht (Unsere Vorfahren) at approximately 3000 BC. At the time, they were generally considered to be much younger, but Hofdijk, perhaps by chance, assumed a date that roughly corresponds to the findings of modern scholarship.

In 1861 and 1867, illicit excavations resulted in significant damage to the large stone tomb De Papeloze Kerk (D49). To prevent further deterioration, by around 1870, the majority of the tombs had become the property of the state or the province of Drenthe. Subsequently, several sites were restored, albeit in an unprofessional manner, at the suggestion of amateur archaeologist Lucas Oldenhuis Gratama. Gratama adopted Westendorp's erroneous assumption that the graves originally had no mounds and therefore had them removed as supposed wind drifts without documentation.

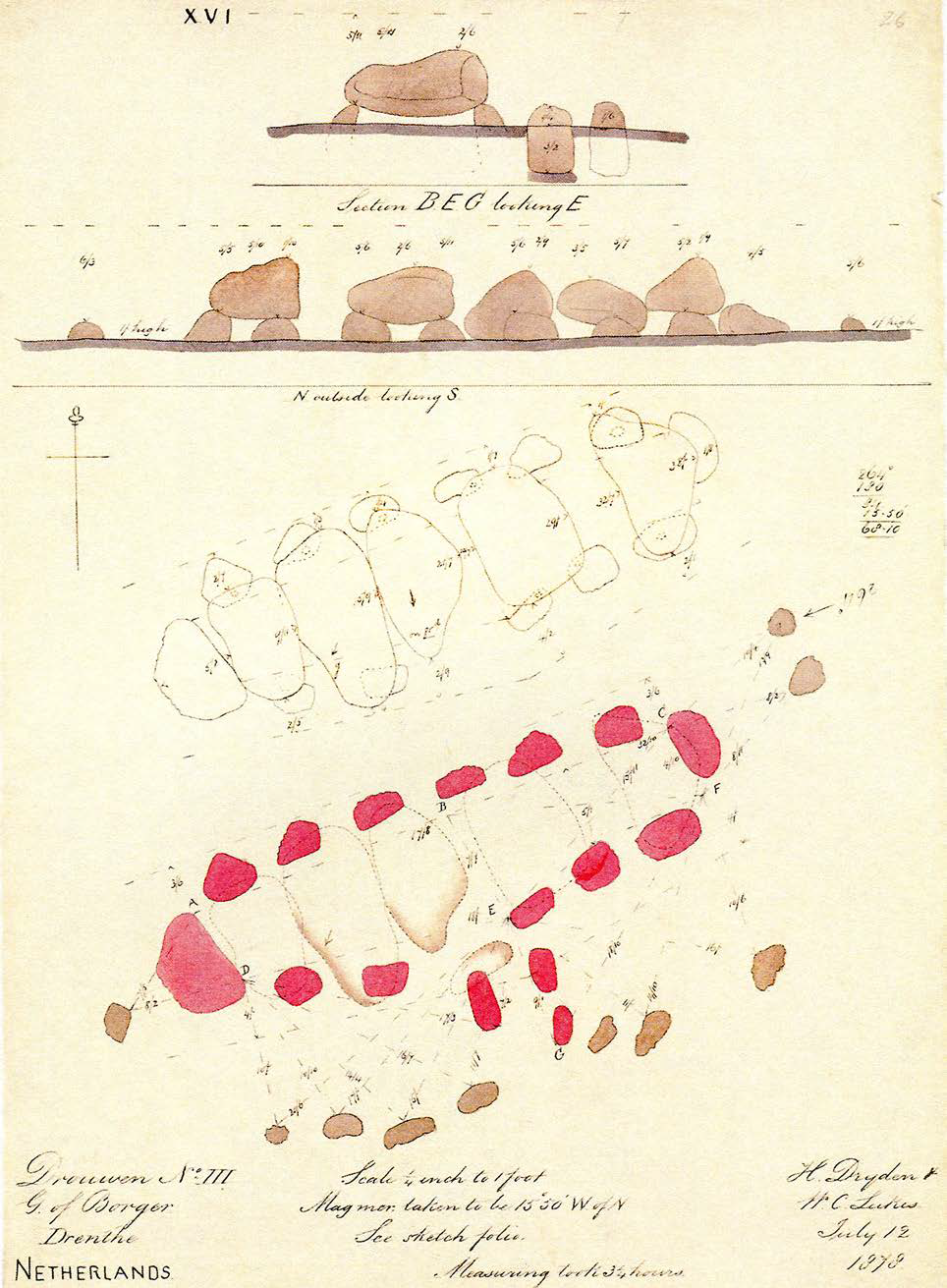
Sectional drawings and floor plan of the Drouwenerveld megalithic tomb (D26), made by Henry Dryden (1878)

In 1871, Augustus Wollaston Franks, the curator of the British Museum, undertook a visit to Drenthe. He was dismayed by the lack of professionalism evident in the restoration of the megalithic tombs. In response, Franks suggested that William Collings Lukis (1817–1892) and Henry Dryden (1818–1899) undertake a research trip to Drenthe in 1878. Both had previously conducted investigations of megalithic sites in the United Kingdom and Brittany, and now produced highly detailed floor plans and sectional drawings of 40 megalithic tombs in the Netherlands, in addition to several watercolors of pottery finds.

Willem Pleyte, the successor of Janssen as curator at the Rijksmuseum van Oudheden, published a comprehensive list of the archaeological sites in the Netherlands known at the time from 1877 onwards. He also made extensive use of photography for the first time. The first known images of Dutch megalithic tombs were taken in 1870. In 1874, Pleyte undertook a photographic expedition through Drenthe, accompanied by the photographer Jan Goedeljee. They photographed all the megalithic tombs in the region. Pleyte subsequently used these images as models for lithographs. It is notable that Conrad Leemans, the director of the Rijksmuseum, undertook a similar photographic expedition to Drenthe in 1877. Jan Ernst Henric Hooft van Iddekinge, who had already been to Drenthe with Pleyte, prepared plans of the megalithic tombs for Leemans. However, the quality of these plans did not match the work of Lukis and Dryden.

The realization that the Dutch megalithic tombs were part of a Stone Age culture that spanned large parts of northern and central Europe gradually gained acceptance from the end of the 19th century. Nicolaus Westendorp had already noted the great similarity to the graves in northwest Germany in 1815. Augustus Wollaston Franks observed in 1872 that not only the graves but also the grave goods found were very similar to those from Germany and Denmark. In 1890, the Königsberg prehistorian Otto Tischler established the existence of various regional groups within the Funnelbeaker Culture for the first time and defined the distribution area of the Western Group more precisely. At the beginning of the 20th century, Gustaf Kossinna distinguished four regional groups based on the pottery: a northern, western, eastern, and southern group. In the 1930s, Konrad Jażdżewski presented an even more precise overview, subdividing Kossinna's eastern group into an eastern and south-eastern group.

=== 20th and 21st century ===
In the early decades of the 20th century, the physician Willem Johannes de Wilde made significant contributions to the field of research. Between 1904 and 1906, he conducted a comprehensive survey of the surviving megalithic tombs in the Netherlands, meticulously documenting his observations through detailed drawings, photographs, and a comprehensive catalog of questions pertaining to the architectural characteristics of each site. Unfortunately, the majority of his original notes have been lost, leaving only fragments of his insights.

A new phase of megalithic research in the Netherlands commenced in 1912 with the excavation of two megalithic tombs near Drouwen (D19 and D20) by the Leiden archaeologist Jan Hendrik Holwerda. The following year, he conducted an investigation of the Emmen-Schimmeres megalithic tomb (D43).

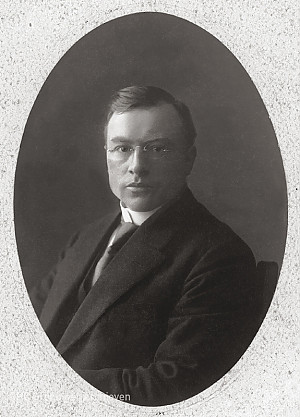
Albert Egges van Giffen

Subsequently, the Groningen archaeologist Albert Egges van Giffen conducted further excavations, which significantly influenced megalithic research in the Netherlands for several decades. In 1918, he conducted a comprehensive excavation of the Havelte 1 megalithic tomb (D53), a megalithic tomb situated in the vicinity of Emmerveld (D40), the Exloo-Noord megalithic tomb (D30), and two additional megalithic tombs. Excavations were conducted in the vicinity of Bronneger (D21 and D22) and a trial excavation was carried out at the Drouwenerveld megalithic tomb (D26), the Balloo megalithic tomb (D16) and another megalithic tomb near Emmerveld (D39). Additionally, between 1918 and 1925, he conducted investigations at the remains of three previously destroyed sites: the Steenwijkerwold megalithic tomb (O1), the stone cist in the Rijsterbos (F1), and the Weerdinge megalithic tomb (D37a). Furthermore, he conducted a comprehensive survey of all surviving sites in the Netherlands between 1925 and 1927, publishing the results in two volumes of text and an atlas. In this work, he also developed the numbering system for graves that is still in use today. This system employs a capital letter for the province, followed by a number ascending from north to south. It also includes a lowercase letter for destroyed sites. In 1927, van Giffen conducted further excavations at two additional graves: the Buinen-Noord megalithic tomb (D28) and the Eexterhalte megalithic tomb (D14). In the 1940s, he undertook investigations of the remains of several destroyed sites.

During the Second World War, the stones of the Havelte 1 (D53) megalithic tomb were buried and a runway was constructed on its site. The airfield was subjected to aerial bombardment in 1944 and 1945. Following the cessation of hostilities, the site was reconstructed in its original location.

In the 1950s, van Giffen devoted himself primarily to the restoration of the graves. He made missing wall stones visible by having their holes filled with concrete. In 1952, van Giffen conducted another excavation at the Annen megalithic tomb (D9). In 1957, he collaborated with Jan Albert Bakker at the Noordlaren megalithic tomb (G1). From 1968 to 1970, he worked with Jan Albert Bakker and Willem Glasbergen at the Drouwenerveld megalithic tomb (D26).

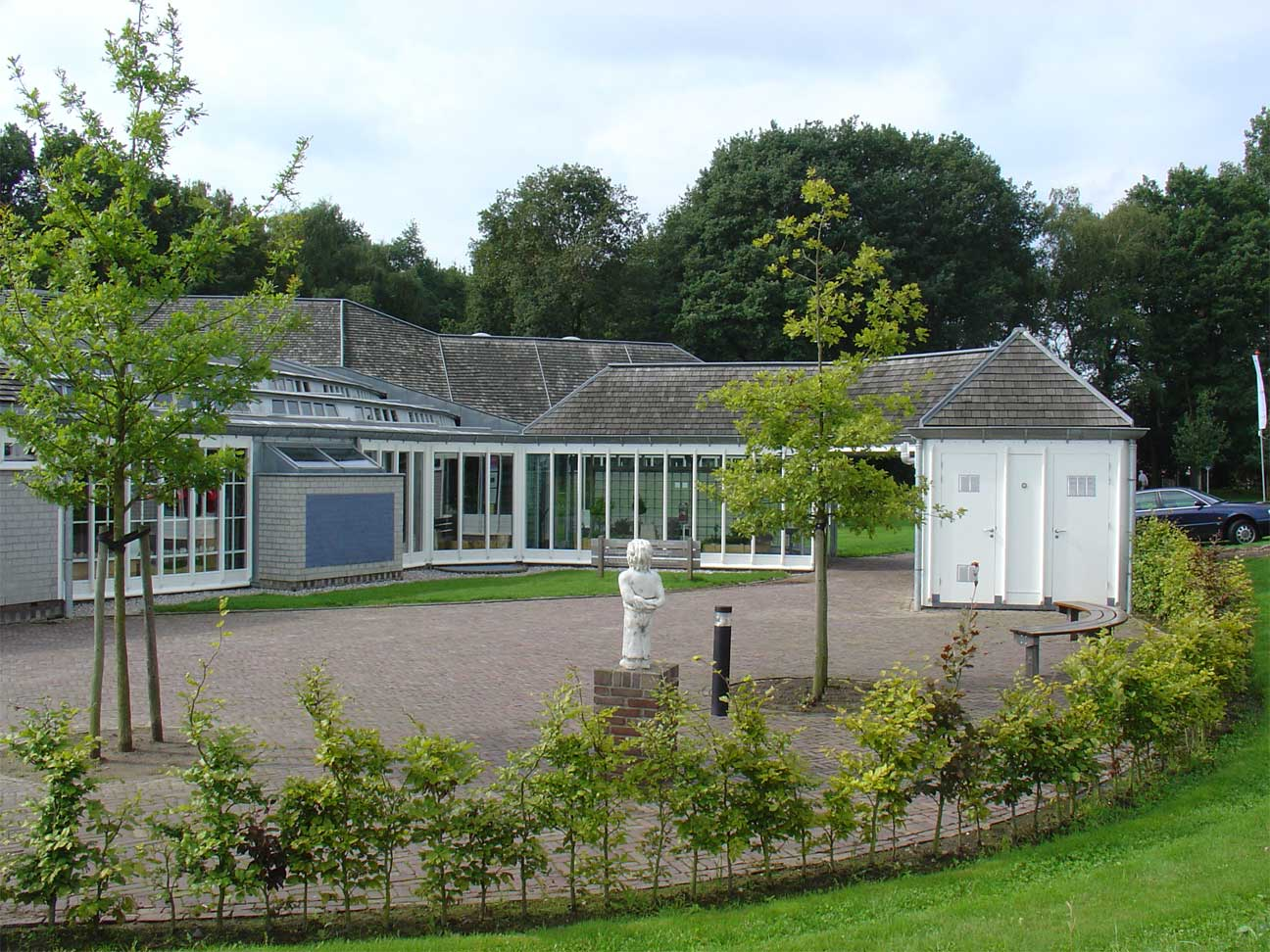
The "Hunebedcentrum" in Borger

The concept of a museum dedicated to the megalithic tombs and their builders was first proposed by van Giffen in 1959. The exhibition, developed by Diderik van der Waals and Wiek Röhling, was initially presented in a restored farmhouse in Borger from 1967. However, the house was destroyed by fire on two occasions, resulting in the museum's relocation to the former almshouse near the Borger large stone tomb (D27). In 2005, a newly constructed visitor center with open-air facilities was inaugurated on this site under the name Hunebedcentrum.

Further excavations were conducted by Jan N. Lanting between 1969 and 1993. These investigations focused on the remains of several previously destroyed sites, the majority of which had been discovered by the amateur archaeologist Jan Evert Musch. Additionally, Lanting examined the Heveskesklooster megalithic tomb, which was only discovered in 1982 and subsequently converted into a museum in 1987.

In the 1970s, Jan Albert Bakker published his dissertation on the Western Group of the Funnelbeaker Culture, which remains an authoritative overview to this day. The burial inventories of the Dutch megalithic tombs known at the time constituted a significant portion of his data basis. In 1992, he published a monograph on the architecture of the graves, and in 2010, another on the history of research.

In the 1980s, Anna L. Brindley developed a seven-stage internal chronology system for the Funnel Beaker West group, based on the extensive pottery finds from the megalithic graves.

The few bone remains known from the Dutch graves were not systematically examined for a considerable period of time. This only changed in the years between 2012 and 2015, when Liesbeth Smits and Nynke de Vries analyzed the cremations found in the megalithic tombs.

In 2017, all the megalithic tombs in the Netherlands were recorded in a three-dimensional atlas using photogrammetry. The data was obtained from a collaboration between the province of Drente and the University of Groningen by the Gratama Foundation.

== Population and distribution ==
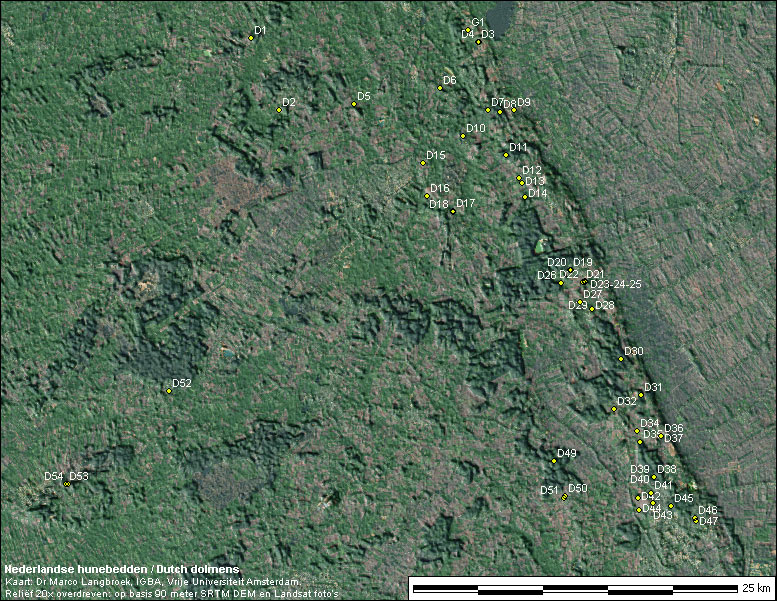
Relief and high relief map with the megalithic tombs in the province of Drenthe

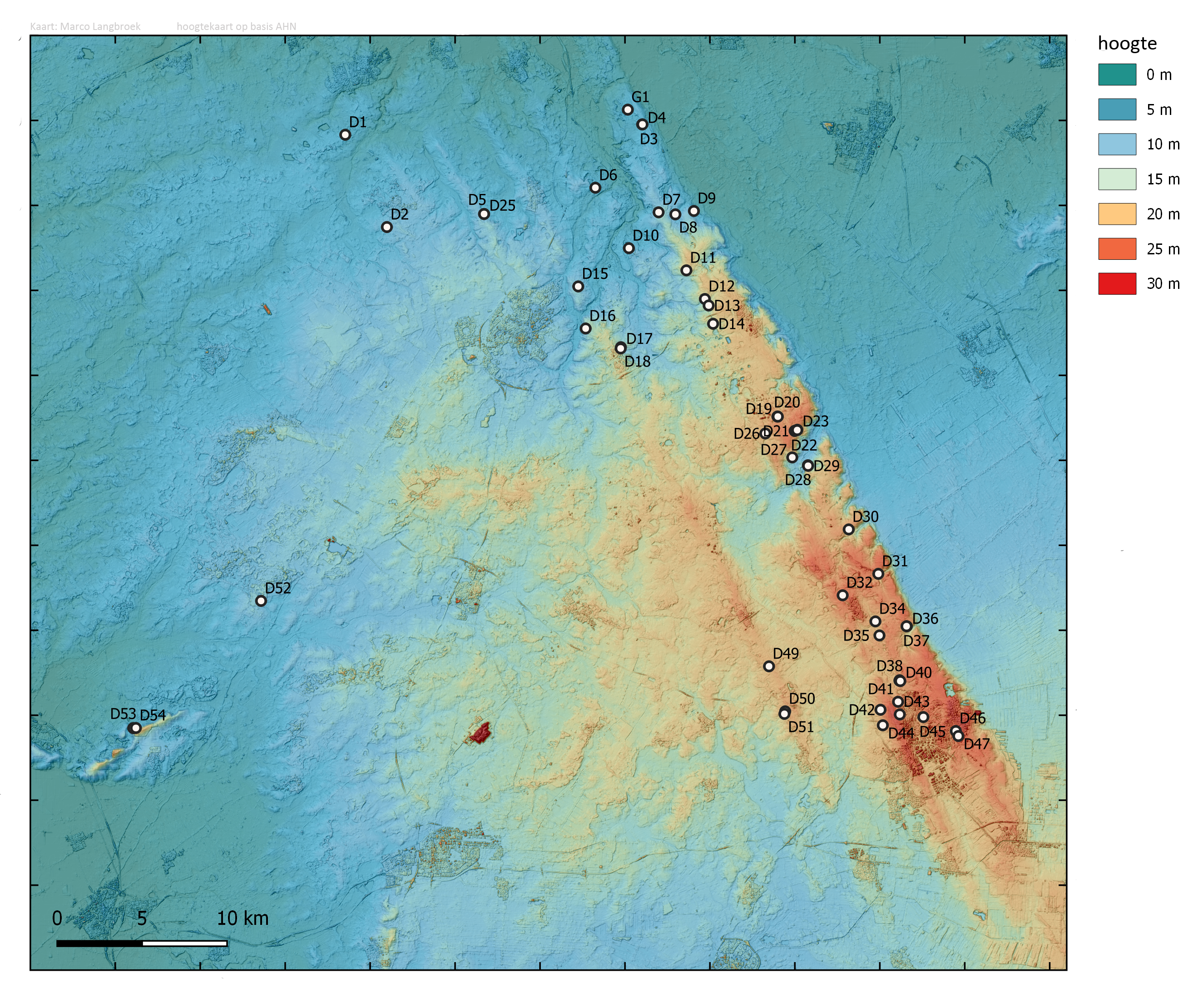

It is not known how many megalithic tombs originally existed in the Netherlands. Probably there were more than 100. Today, 53 tombs have been preserved. In addition, there is one that has been turned into a museum and a stone complex that is questionable as to whether it is the remains of a megalithic tomb. In addition, 23 destroyed tombs are known to have been found. Jan Albert Bakker also lists nine possible sites for which only vague information is available from older literature and whose classification as megalithic tombs is uncertain (he considers information on 19 other sites to be unreliable). Bert Huiskes was also able to identify 96 field names for the province of Drenthe that indicate possible megalithic tomb ruins.

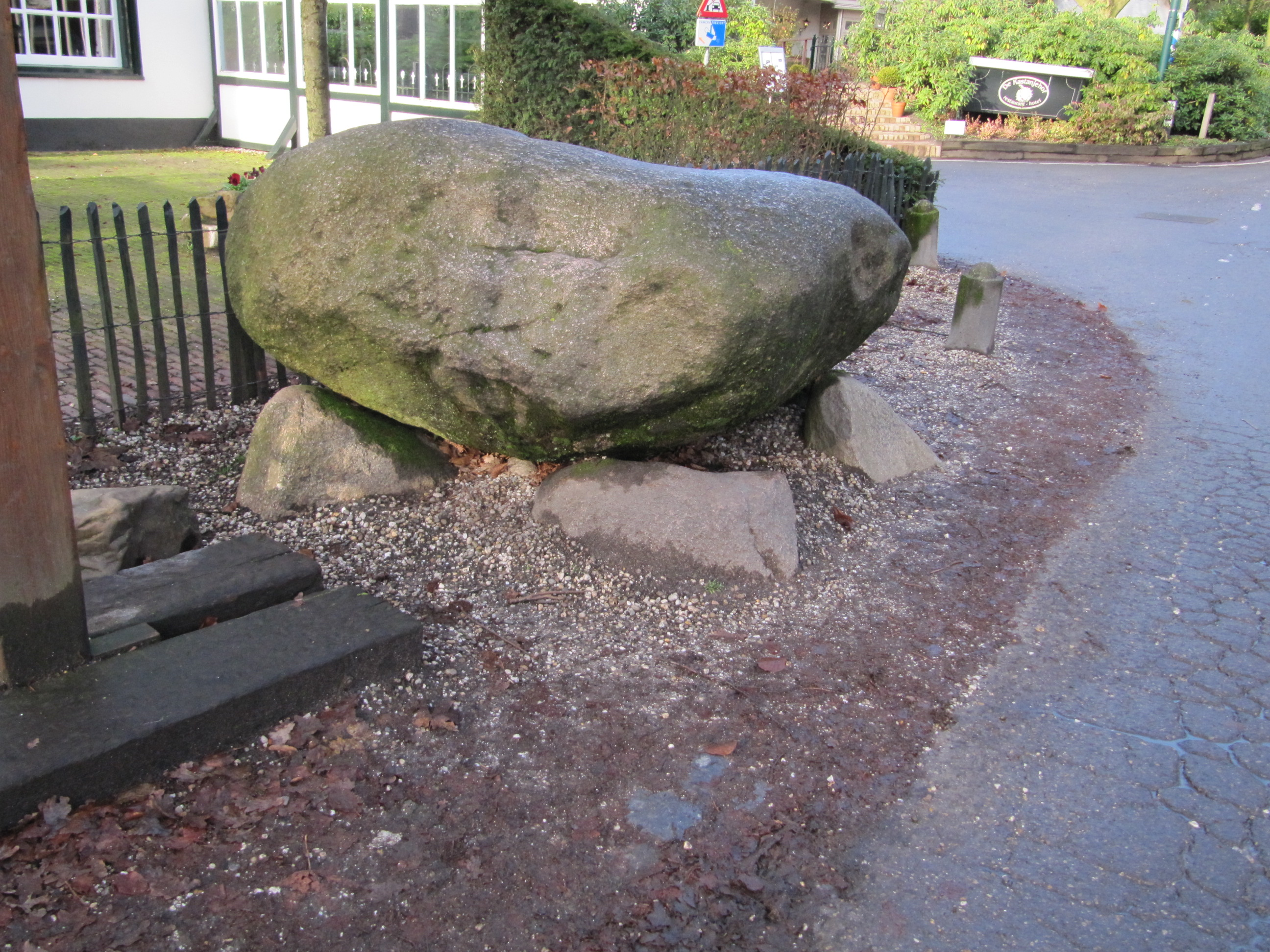
The stone from Lage Vuursche, possible remains of a megalithic tomb in the province of Utrecht

The megalithic tombs in the Netherlands were constructed by members of the Funnelbeaker culture, a Neolithic cultural complex that originated in Denmark and subsequently spread across large parts of Europe from approximately 4100 BC to 2800 BC. The Funnelbeaker Culture was divided into several regional groups, with the northernmost group extending from central Sweden to the Czech Republic, while the southernmost group extended from the Netherlands in the west to Ukraine in the east. Megalithic burial structures were not a ubiquitous phenomenon throughout the entire distribution area, but rather were concentrated in specific regions, including Scandinavia, Denmark, northern and central Germany, northwestern Poland, and the Netherlands. The Dutch megalithic tombs, in conjunction with the sites in western Lower Saxony, are considered to be part of the western group of the Funnelbeaker Culture. The original total number of graves is difficult to ascertain with precision. Currently, approximately 20,000 sites are known to have survived or are known with certainty. Of these, over 11,600 are located in Germany, 7,000 in Denmark, and 650 in Sweden. The total number of all large stone tombs of the Funnelbeaker Culture ever erected is likely to have been at least 75,000, perhaps even up to 500,000. The Dutch tombs therefore represent a comparatively small group at the westernmost edge of the Funnelbeaker Culture.

The surviving graves are all located in the provinces of Drenthe and Groningen. The majority of them are concentrated in a narrow strip running from north-northwest to south-southeast on the Hondsrug ridge between the towns of Groningen and Emmen. Almost all of these graves are accessible via the N34 highway. Three sites are located some distance to the west of the main group near Diever and Havelte. In addition to the aforementioned sites, there is a loose scattering of several destroyed sites between the main group and the aforementioned sites. In the northern region of the province of Groningen, near the coast, the large stone tomb Heveskesklooster (G5) was discovered in 1983 beneath a terp in the municipality of Eemsdelta and subsequently relocated to the Muzeeaquarium Delfzijl.

Two megalithic tombs are known from the province of Overijssel. The Steenwijkerwold megalithic tomb (O1) was located in the province's far north, approximately 8 km from the two megalithic tombs near Havelte (D53 and D54). The Mander megalithic tomb (O2) was located east of the province, near the German border. A few kilometers to the north were the megalithic tombs near Uelsen in the county of Grafschaft Bentheim in Lower Saxony.

The Lage Vuursche stone (U1) is situated at a considerable distance from the other sites in the northern region of the province of Utrecht. If this is indeed the remains of a megalithic tomb, it would represent the southernmost and westernmost such tomb in the Netherlands and the westernmost in the distribution area of the Funnelbeaker culture.

Bakker also posits the possibility that megalithic tombs may have originated in the province of Gelderland, as similar megalithic burial sites have been identified in the neighboring region to the east, northern North Rhine-Westphalia.

An overview of the currently known and potentially identified megalithic tombs in the Netherlands.
Province	maintained	implemented	destroyed	uncertain/ preserved	uncertain/ destroyed	Field names references
Drenthe	52		18		8	96
Groningen	1	1	3			
Overijssel			2		1	
Utrecht				1		

== Grave architecture ==
=== Grave types ===
The Funnelbeaker Culture is characterized by the construction of large stone tombs, which feature mounded burial chambers built from boulders. These are divided into several types based on various characteristics, with the main feature being the position of the entrance to the burial chamber. If it is located on a long side, it is referred to as a passage grave. The dolmen is the counterpart to the passage grave. It has an entrance on a narrow side or, in the case of very small structures (the Urdolmen), has no entrance at all. Further classification features include the number of passage stones, the shape of the mound, and the presence or absence of a stone enclosure.

Of the 54 surviving enclosures in the Netherlands, 52 can be classified with certainty or a high degree of probability as passage graves. Another is too badly destroyed for a reliable classification. Albert Egges van Giffen once again distinguished four subtypes:

The term "ganggraf" (passage grave) was employed by Van Giffen to describe graves with a stone enclosure and a covered passage in front of the entrance.

- The "portaalgraf" (portal grave) is defined by van Giffen as a type of grave whose entrance is preceded by a pair of passage stones without a capstone.
- The "trapgraf" (staircase grave) is a type of enclosure sunk into the ground whose burial chambers are accessible by a stone staircase rather than a horizontal passage. The only example of this type in the Netherlands is the Eext megalithic tomb (D13). Tombs with this type of access construction are also rare in the rest of the Funnelbeaker Culture distribution area. Only four examples from Lower Saxony (the Deinste 1 megalithic tomb, the Krelingen megalithic tomb, the Sieben Steinhäuser C megalithic tomb, and the destroyed Meckelstedt 2 megalithic tomb) are known to be comparable.
- The term "langgraf" (long grave) is used to describe a complex consisting of a long barrow bed enclosing multiple burial chambers. The only example of this type in the Netherlands is the Emmen-Schimmeres megalithic tomb (D43). Additionally, analogous sites of this type have been identified in Lower Saxony, including the Daudieck megalithic bed A, the Kleinenkneten II megalithic tomb, and the Tannenhausen megalithic tomb.
Schematic representation of the passage grave types according to van Giffen

ganggraf

portaalgraf

trapgraf

langgraf

In more recent literature (e.g., Bakker), the terms van Giffens are no longer used, and all these sites are instead referred to simply as passage graves. In Lower Saxony, the term Emsland chamber was coined for a sub-type of passage grave typical of the western group of the Funnelbeaker Culture. A large proportion of the Dutch passage graves also correspond to this type. The Emsland chamber is distinguished by a relatively lengthy, predominantly east–west oriented burial chamber with an entrance on the southern long side, which is enclosed at a short distance by a stone enclosure.

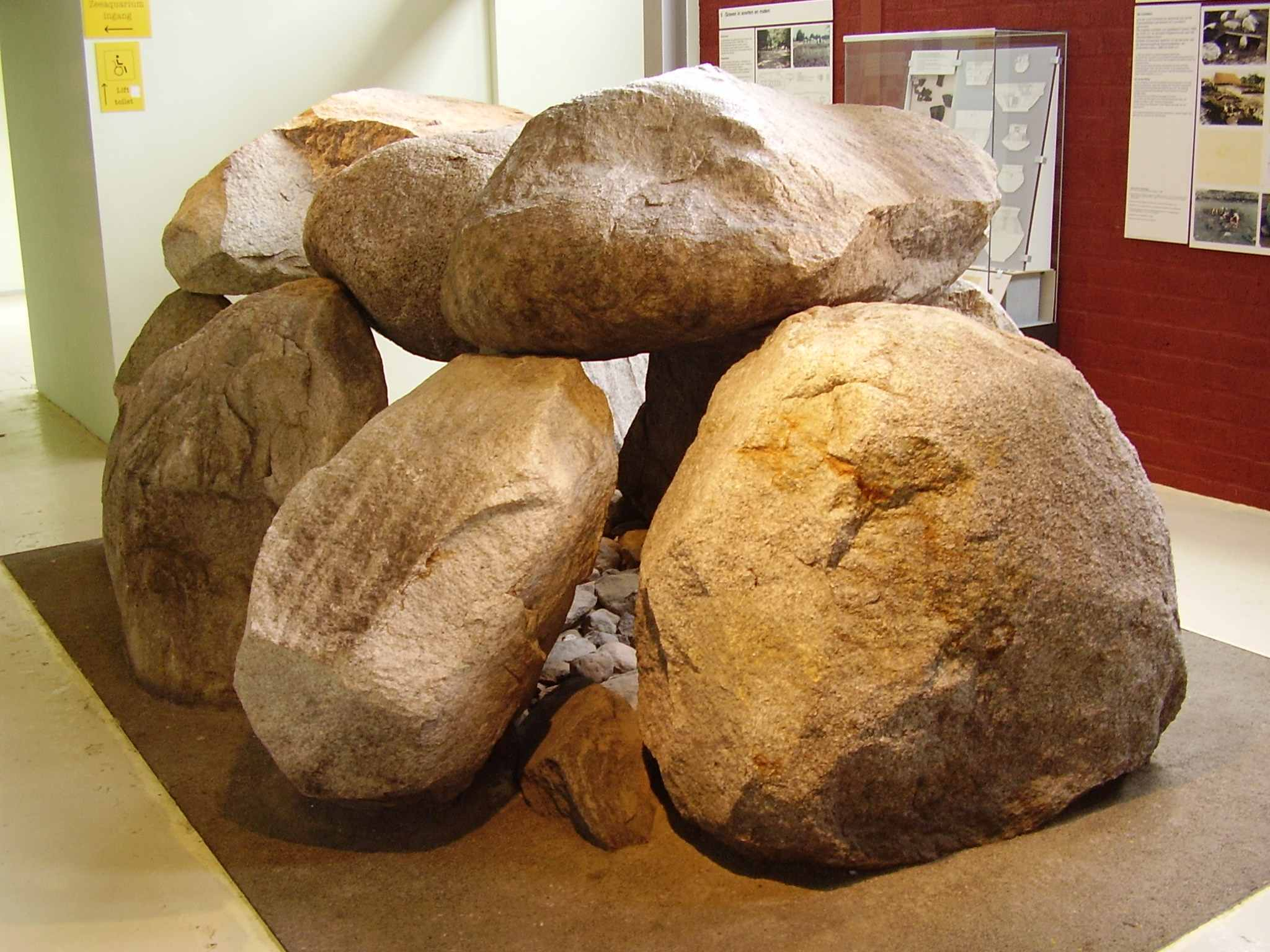
The Heveskesklooster megalithic tomb, the only known dolmen in the Netherlands

The Heveskesklooster (G5) is a notable exception among the Dutch sites. It is the only known dolmen (or more precisely, a great dolmen) in the country. It consists of three pairs of wall stones on the long sides, a capstone on the northern narrow side, and three capstones. The entrance is located on the open southern narrow side.

Smaller burial complexes, which are typically constructed by deepening the chambers into the ground and using small stone slabs, are referred to as stone cists. Examples of these structures from the Funnelbeaker period have also been identified in the Netherlands. However, these structures are not typically classified as large stone tombs.

=== Mound fill and enclosure ===
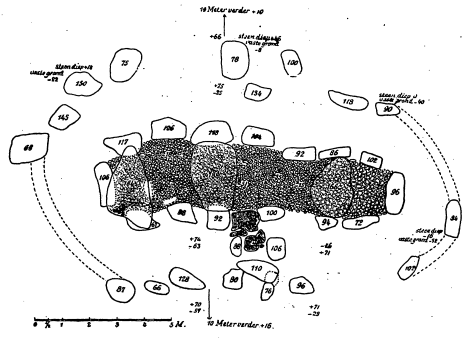
Ground plan of the megalithic tomb D20 near Drouwen with partially preserved enclosure

All the graves originally had a mound fill. This was round in the smaller sites and oval in the larger ones. Only the Emmen-Schimmeres megalithic tomb (D43) has a different shape. Here, the two burial chambers lie in a slightly trapezoidal long bed with rounded narrow sides and a stone enclosure. An enclosure was also found in eight or nine other enclosures. These enclosures are invariably larger, with a chamber length of at least 8 m.

=== Burial chamber ===
==== Orientation ====
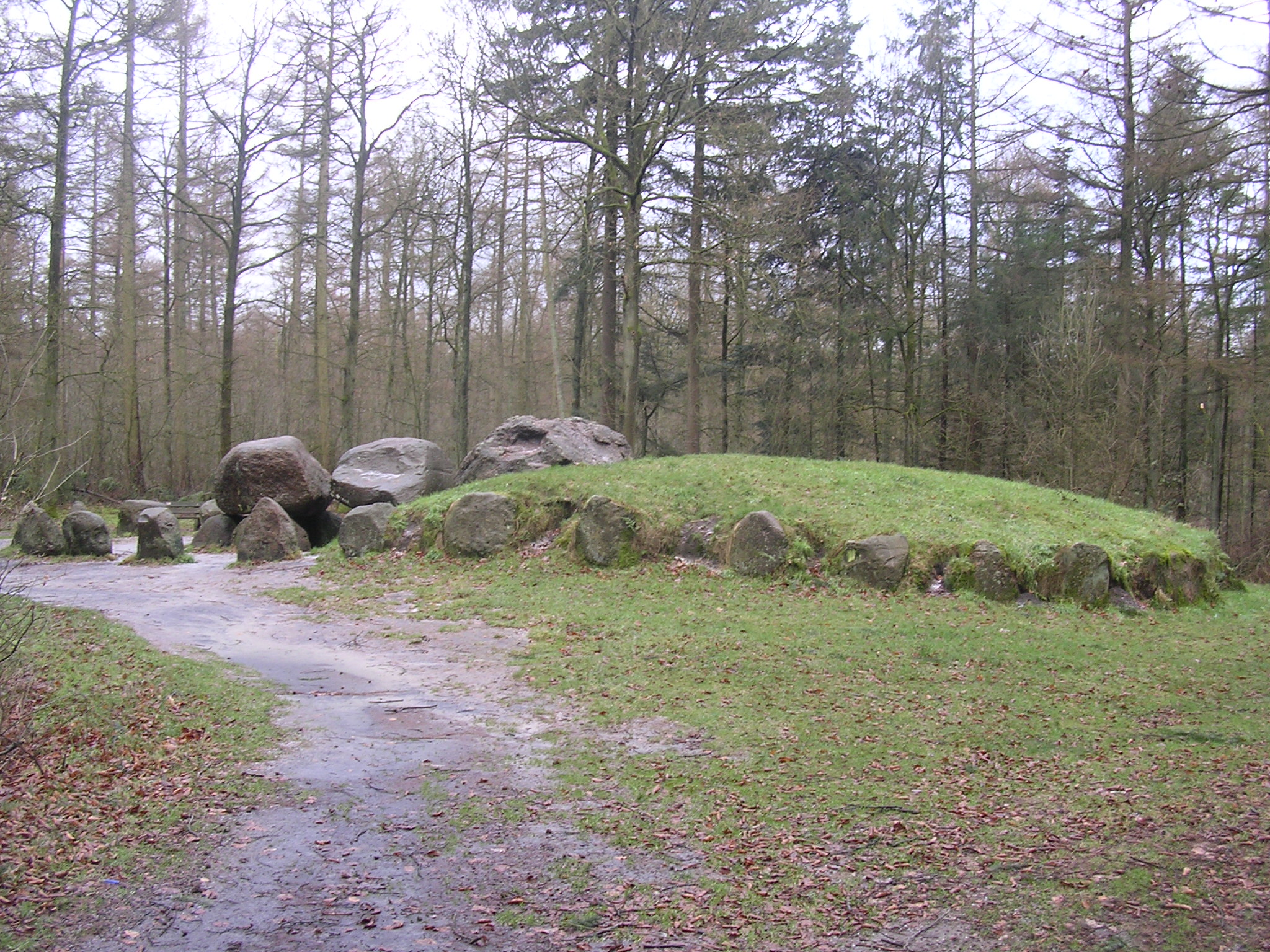
The Papeloze Kerk megalithic tomb (D49) with half of the mound reconstructed

In the majority of passage tombs, the burial chambers are oriented approximately east–west, with the entrance facing south. There is considerable variation in orientation, ranging from northeast–southwest to southeast–northwest. However, the ends of almost all chambers lie within the extreme points of the rising and setting of the sun and moon. Six chambers deviate from this and have an orientation between south-southeast-north-northwest and south-southwest-north-northeast.

==== Chamber size and number of stones ====
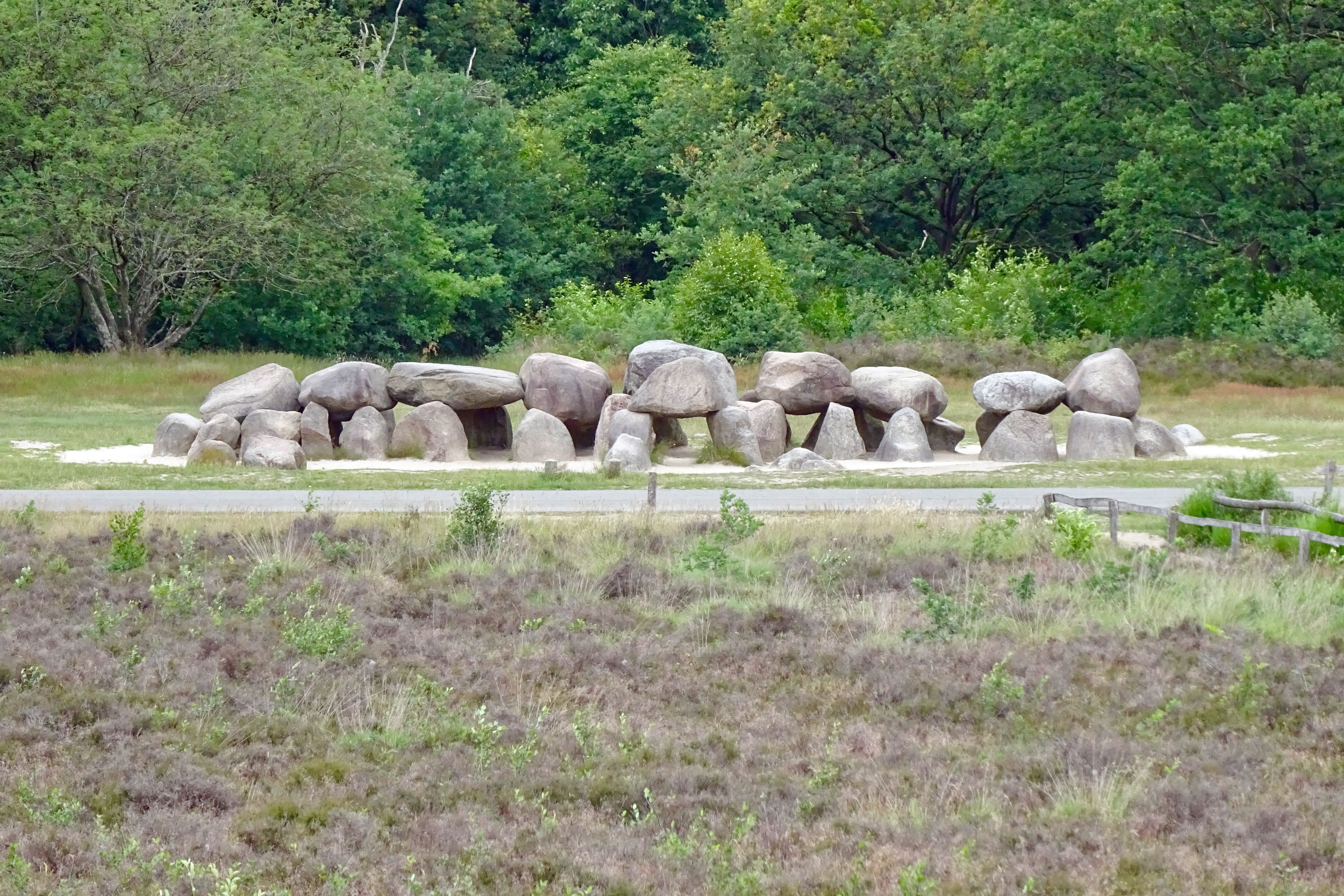
The megalithic tomb D53 near Havelte with ten pairs of wall stones on the long sides and nine capstones

The dimensions of the chambers exhibit considerable variability. The shortest chamber, with an inner length of 2.5 m, is observed in the large dolmen of Heveskesklooster (G5). The smallest passage grave was the destroyed megalithic tomb Glimmen-Zuid (G3), with an inner chamber length of 2.7 m and an outer length of 3.2 m. The Borger megalithic tomb (D27) has the largest burial chamber. It has an inner length of 20 m, an outer length of 22.6 m, and a width of 4.1 m.

The number of pairs of wall stones on the long sides is between two and ten, the number of capstones between two and nine.

==== Chamber shape ====
The ground plan of the burial chambers of the passage tombs is typically slightly trapezoidal, with a slight widening on the left side as seen from the entrance. This widening is observed in 36 chambers, with a corresponding shape identified in 29 of them. However, the difference in width varies considerably. In the majority of the tombs, the width difference is between 7 cm and 50 cm. However, three chambers exhibit a significantly greater difference in width, with values of 87 cm, 88 cm, and 106 cm, respectively. Of the remaining seven chambers measured, five are wider at the right end than at the left. Here, the difference in width is only between 9 cm and 21 cm. In two chambers, both ends are exactly the same width.

==== The entrance ====
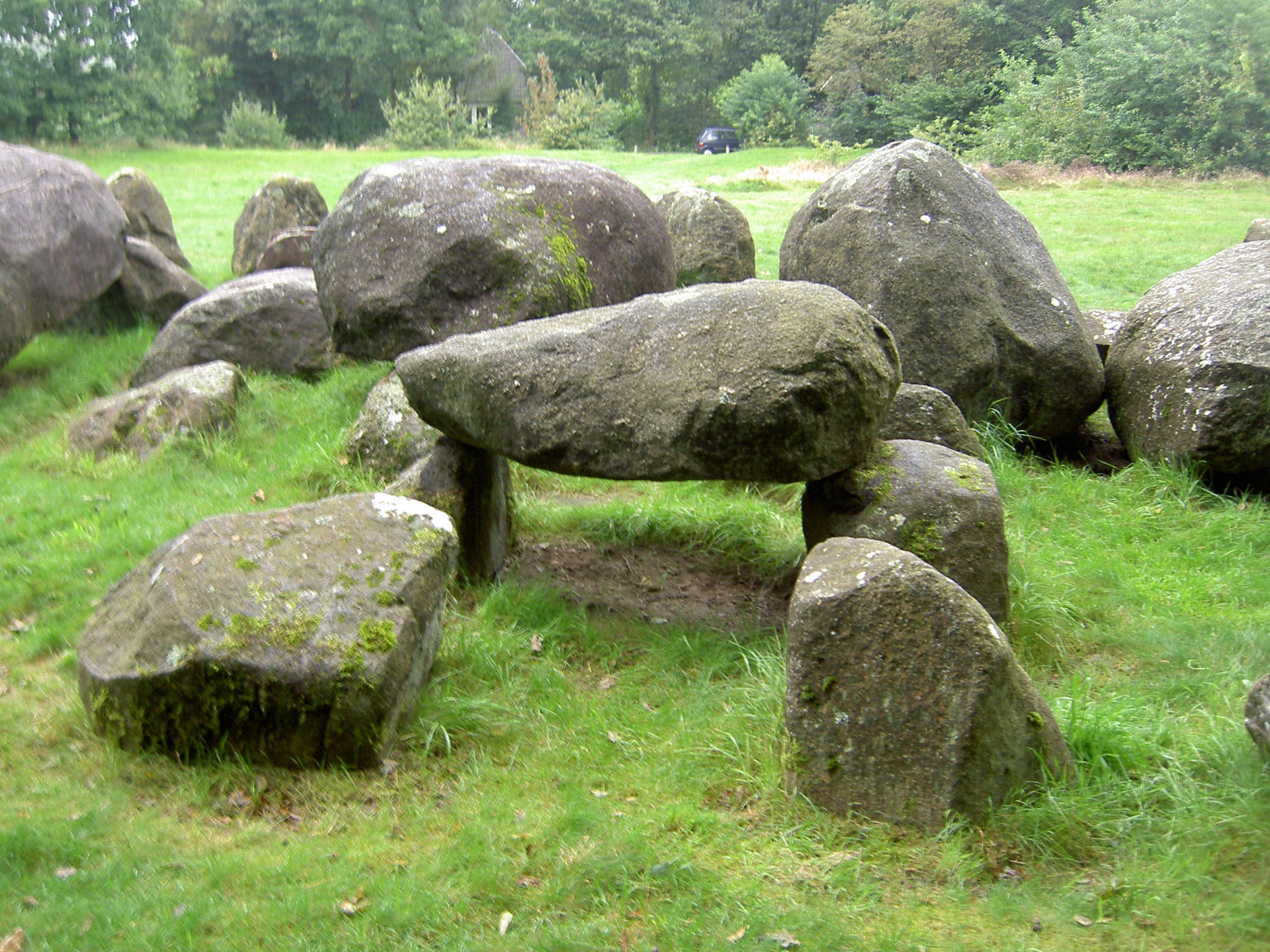
The passage of the D20 megalithic tomb near Drouwen

In the majority of cases, the entrance to the chambers of the passage tombs is situated in the middle of the southern or eastern long side. In the tombs with three to five pairs of wall stones, the entrances are typically offset to the right. However, there are also instances where they are precisely in the middle and, on two occasions, they are offset to the left. Of the seven graves with seven pairs of wall stones, four have an entrance that is more or less precisely in the middle, one is offset to the left, and one is offset to the right. In the graves with nine or ten pairs of wall stones, the entrances are also in the middle or slightly offset to the right. Only the Emmen-Noord megalithic tomb (D41) deviates conspicuously from this construction method. The structure comprises four pairs of wall stones and has an entrance located at the western end of the southern long side between the first and second wall stones.

The entrance to the chamber is either a simple opening between two wall stones or preceded by a passageway, which typically has one or two pairs of wall stones. Only one grave has evidence of a passage with three pairs of wall stones. Longer corridors, such as those typical of the large stone tombs of the Funnelbeaker North group, do not occur in the Netherlands.

At the large stone tomb Eext (D13), a staircase leads to the entrance instead of a passageway. According to van Lier's investigation in 1756, this staircase consisted of four steps, each made of one or two flat stone slabs and bordered by two walls of rolled stones. At the bottom of the stairs was a threshold stone directly in the entrance to the chamber. In 1927, Albert Egges van Giffen discovered that the staircase construction had been destroyed.

==== The chamber floor ====
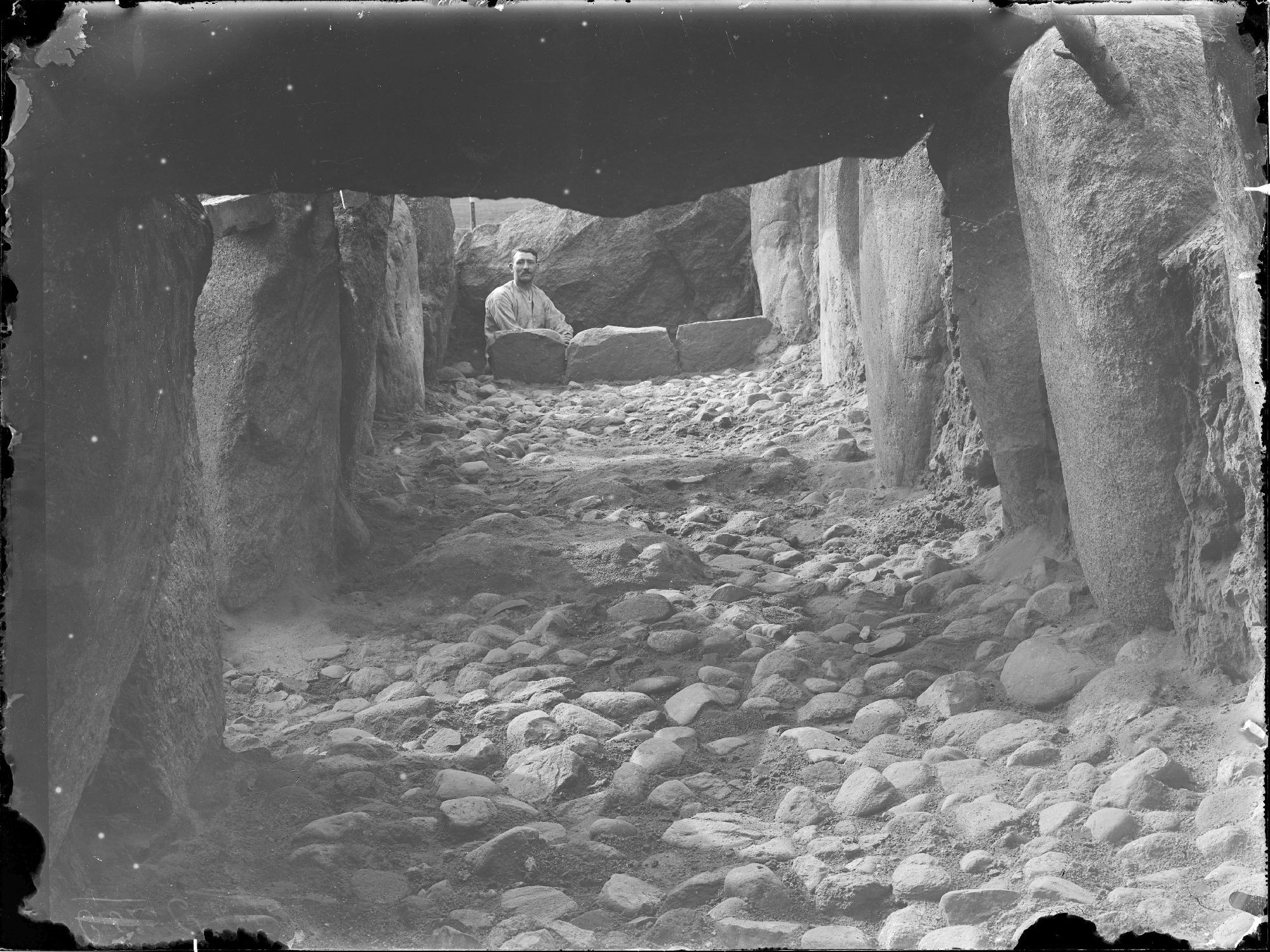
The uncovered paving of the large stone grave D19 near Drouwen; in the background the row of vertical stone slabs

The floor of the burial chambers is typically composed of multiple layers of different stones. The uppermost layer typically consists of burnt granite grus. This is followed by sandstone slabs or rubble of round or flat shape. In some graves, there appears to have been another layer of stones underneath. The floors are typically not level, but exhibit a slight decline towards the center. The differences in height range from 25 to 50 cm.

In the Funnelbeaker North Group, the burial chambers are frequently subdivided into multiple sections by stone slabs set vertically into the floor. This is less prevalent in the Western group and is only known from one grave in the Netherlands. In the northern megalithic tomb at Drouwen (D19), Jan Hendrik Holwerda discovered a row of three 70 cm long and 30 cm high slabs at the north-western end of the chamber, which delineated a small space 2 m wide and 1 m long.

==== Dry stone ====
The gaps between the wall stones of the chambers were originally filled from the outside with dry stone made of horizontally laid hewn stone slabs. Only remnants of this remain today. The maximum preserved height of the masonry was 1.4 m in the large stone tomb Bronneger 1 (D21). In some of the very long chambers, larger gaps were not completely filled with dry masonry. Instead, smaller upright erratic blocks were also inserted, which did not carry a capstone.

== Funerals ==
In contrast to many other areas with megalithic tombs, very little organic material has survived in the Dutch megalithic tombs. This also applies to the bones of the people buried here. Jan Hendrik Holwerda, during his investigation of the two sites in Drouwen, was able to identify poorly preserved human skeletal remains in grave D19. These were mainly teeth and remains of jaw bones.

Remains of cremated remains were found in 26 graves. In some cases only a few grams were preserved, but more than 1 kg was recovered from each of the two megalithic tombs at Havelte (D53 and D54) and the destroyed megalithic tomb Glimmen 1 (G2). The total weight of cremated remains recovered from all Dutch megalithic tombs is just under 8 kg. In most cases the bone fragments could only be assigned to single individuals, but in two graves five individuals could be distinguished. A total of 48 individuals were identified.

Bones from several graves were radiocarbon-dated, confirming that they were from funnel beaker burials.

Only limited statements can be made about the sex and age at death of the burials, as neither could be determined accurately or at all for the majority of individuals. According to the analysis of Nynke de Vries, there is probably a slight surplus of males among the dead. Most of the individuals had died as adults. The burials of children and adolescents make up only a small proportion.

== Enclosures ==
=== Ceramics ===
Ceramic vessels make up by far the largest part of the Funnelbeaker Period grave goods. The largest number comes from the megalithic grave Havelte 1 (D53). The sherds found here could be reconstructed into 649 vessels. The destroyed megalithic grave Glimmen 1 (G2) contained about 360 vessels and the megalithic grave Drouwenerveld (D26) 157.

The range of pottery forms is quite diverse. The funnel cup, a bulbous vessel with a long funnel-shaped neck, gave its name to the culture of the Great Stone Cavemen. Similar vessels with eyelets on the neck and shoulder are known as eyelet or showpiece cups. Collar bottles are small, bulbous bottles with a widening below the mouth. Amphora are bulbous vessels with a short cylindrical rim. The eyelet or dolmen bottle has a funnel-shaped neck, which can be very long in some specimens. There are one or two pairs of eyelets at the neck-shoulder junction. A similar vessel shape is the eyelet beaker, in which the eyelets are located near the base. Jugs are tripartite with a funnel-shaped rim and one or two handles. Shoulder cups have the same structure as jugs, but are wider than they are tall. Steep-walled cups have a straight wall that widens slightly at the top. There are also bowls with straight or convex walls and dishes. Fruit or foot bowls consist of a convex or funnel-shaped neck and a similar base. Both may be joined by one or two handles. Neck-grooved vessels are two-piece flat bowls with a conical rim. They do not appear until the late phase of funnel beaker culture. Tulle cups consist of a bowl and an attached hollow spout. Spoons have a solid handle instead of a spout. The two forms are not always easy to distinguish (especially when broken). There are also flat ceramic plates known as baking plates. The only shapes that have been found are a spindle-like object and a model of a stool or throne.

Ceramics

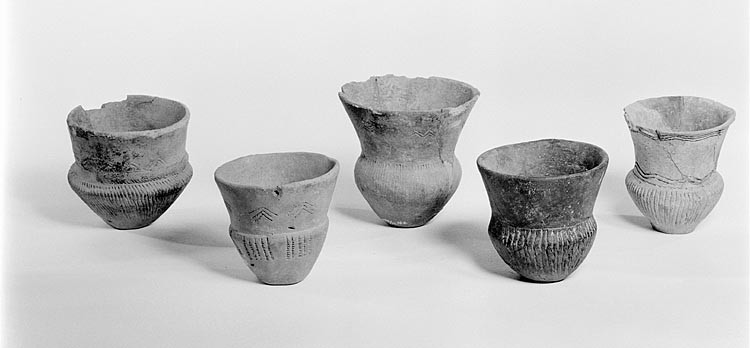
Five funnel beakers, grave D19

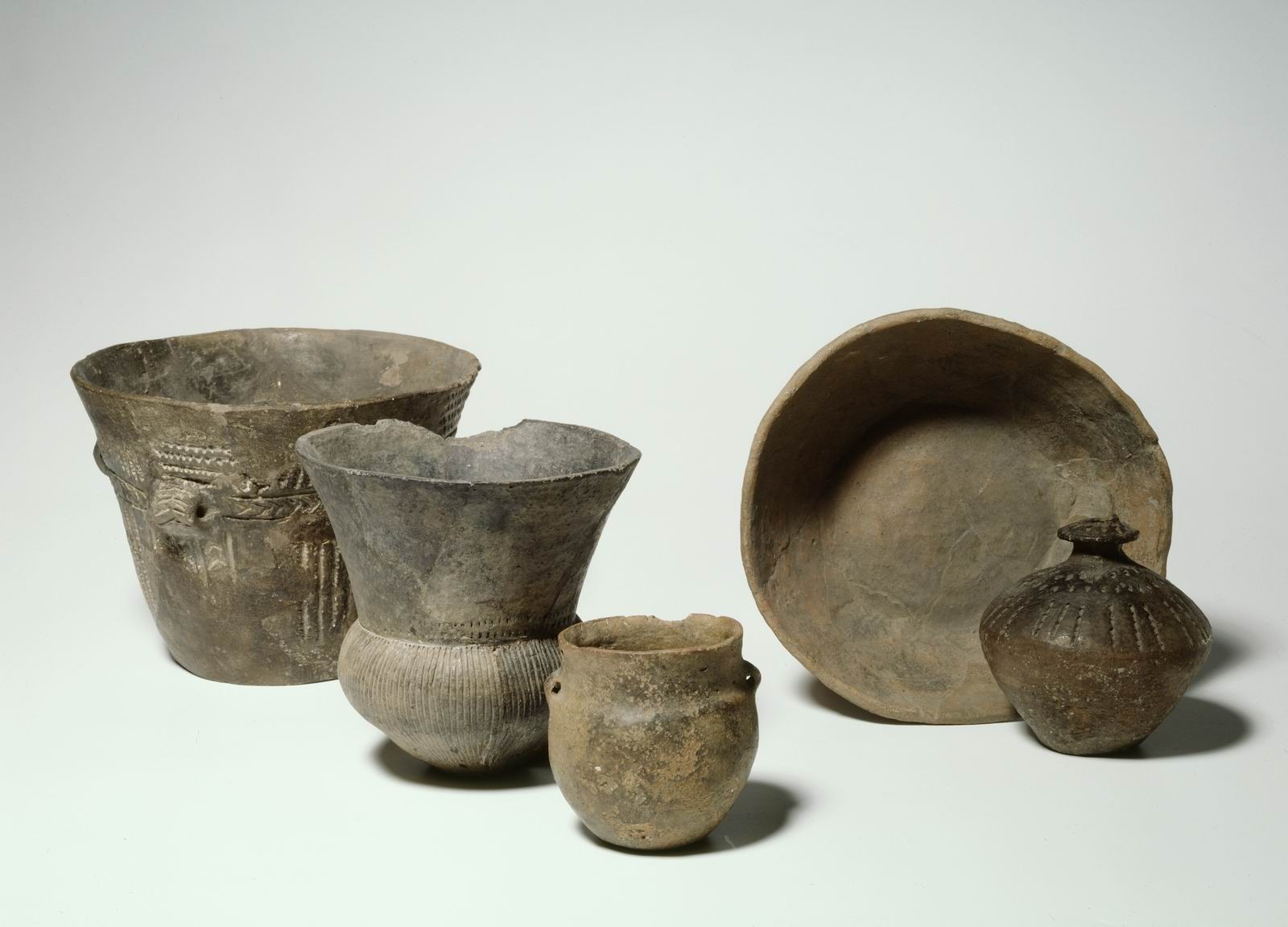
Steep-walled beaker, funnel beaker, amphora, bowl and collar bottle, grave D19

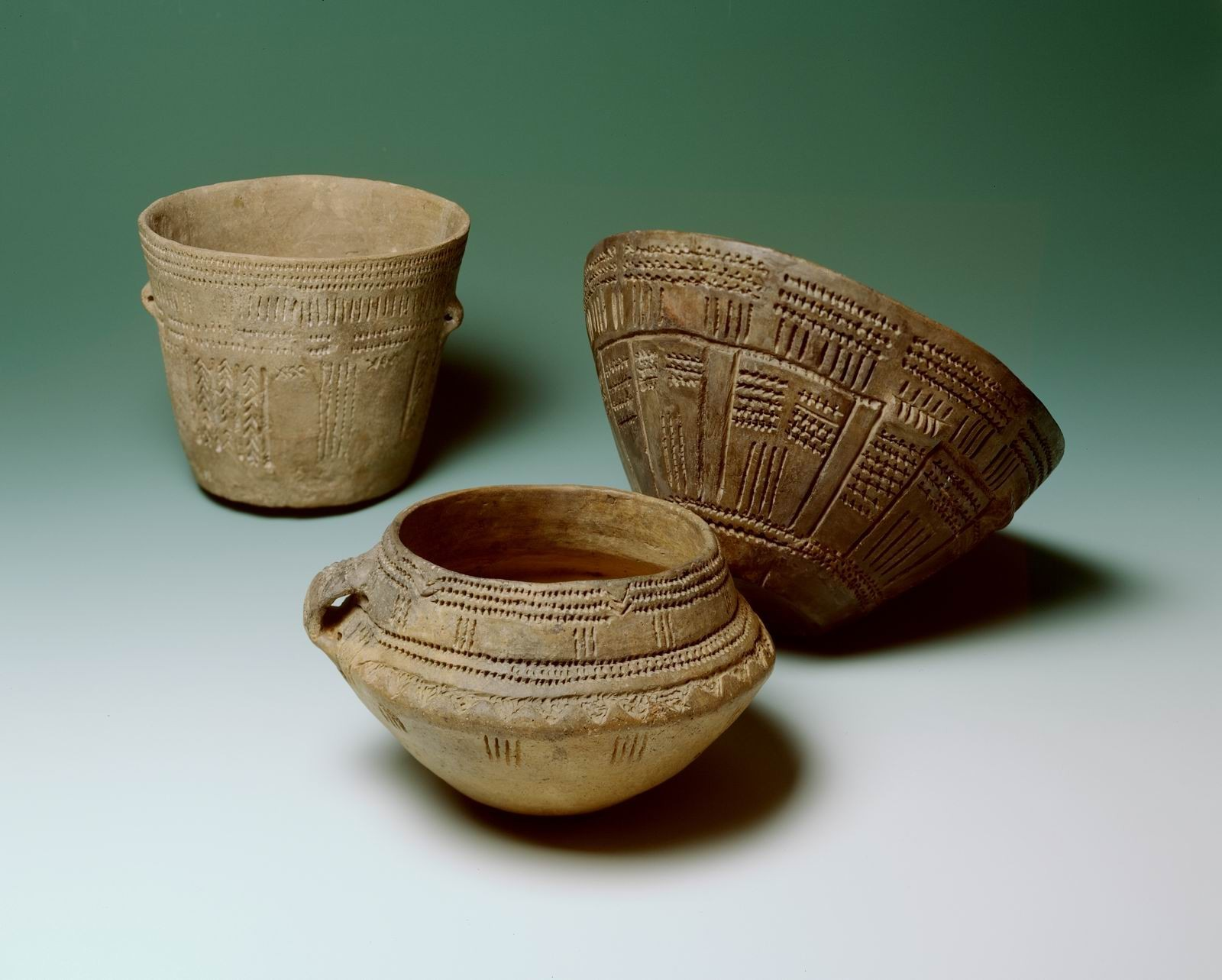
Steep-walled beaker, shoulder cup and bowl, grave D19

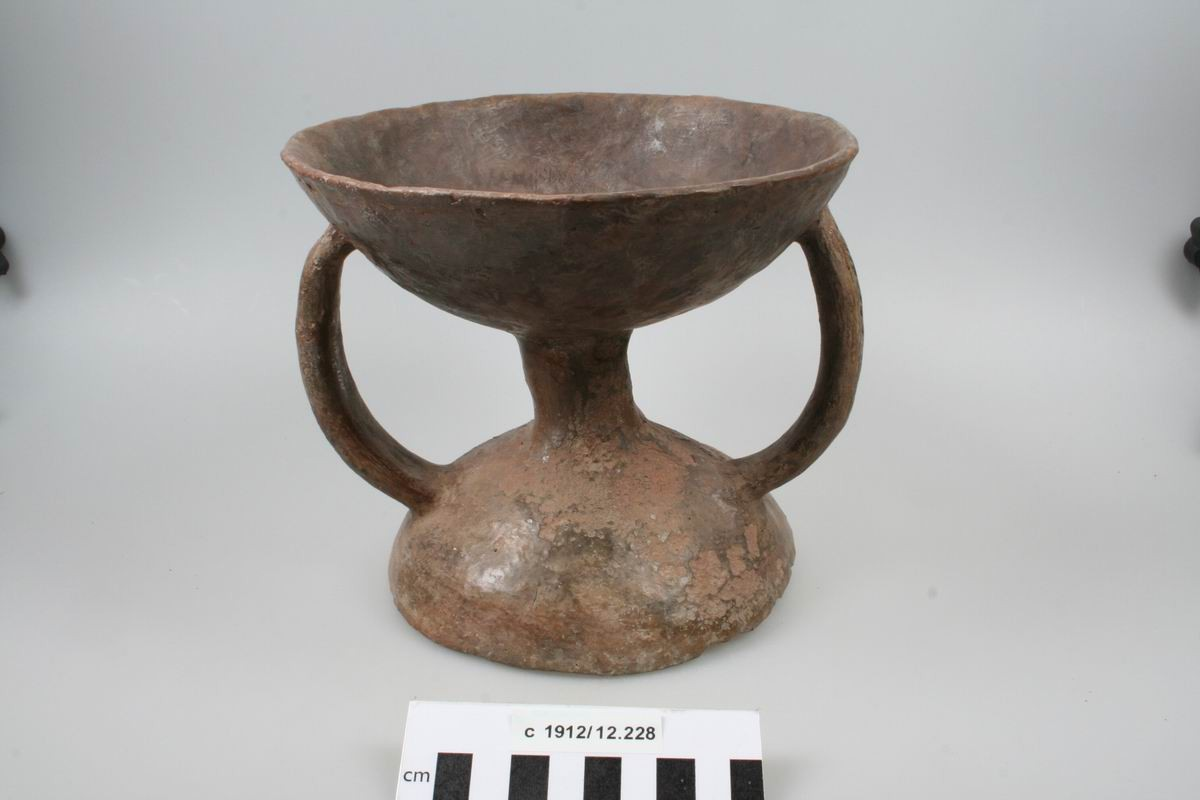
Fruit bowl, grave D19

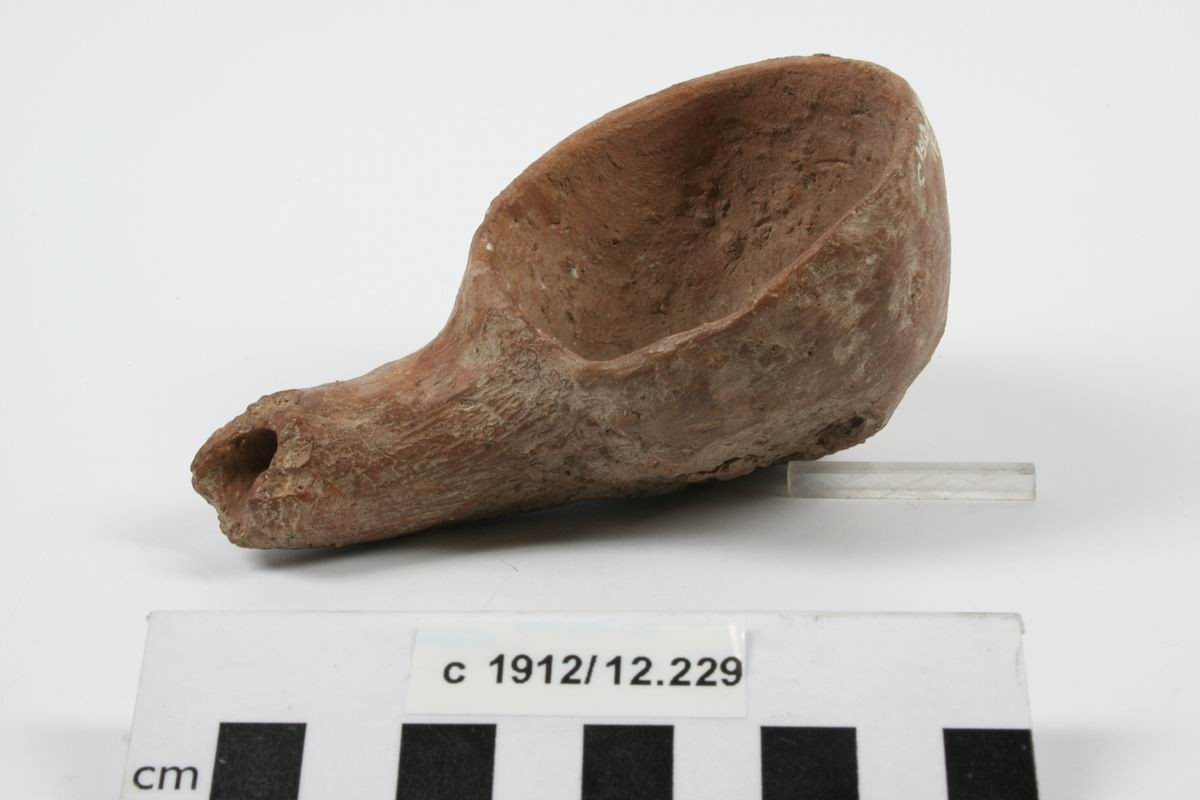
Tulle cup, grave D19

=== Stone tools ===
Other common grave goods are flint tools. These include hatchets, crossed arrowheads, scrapers, blades, and flakes. Crossed arrowheads are the largest group in terms of numbers. Hatchets, axes and stone hammers are rare. A club head is documented only once.

Stone tools

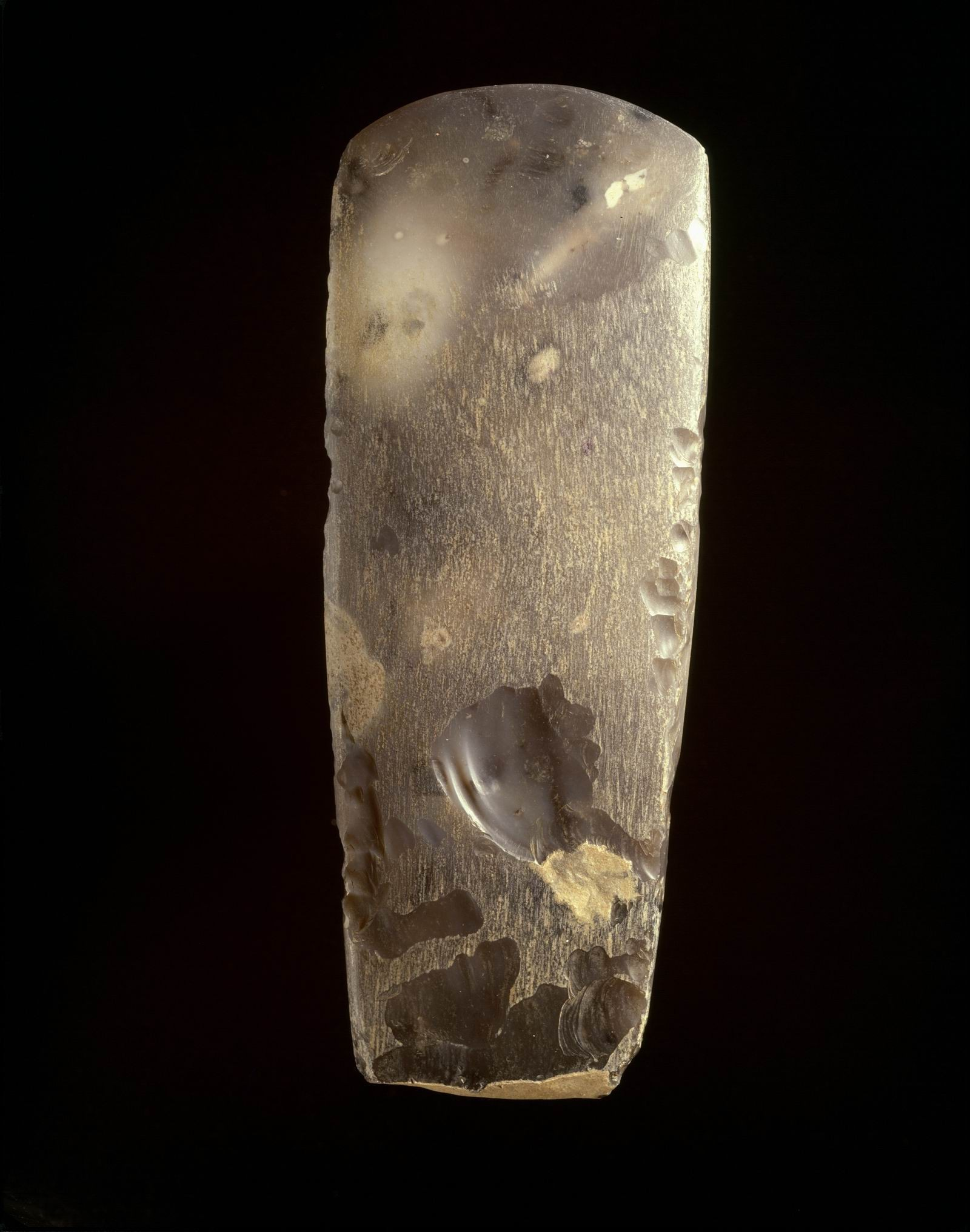
Flint axe, grave D19

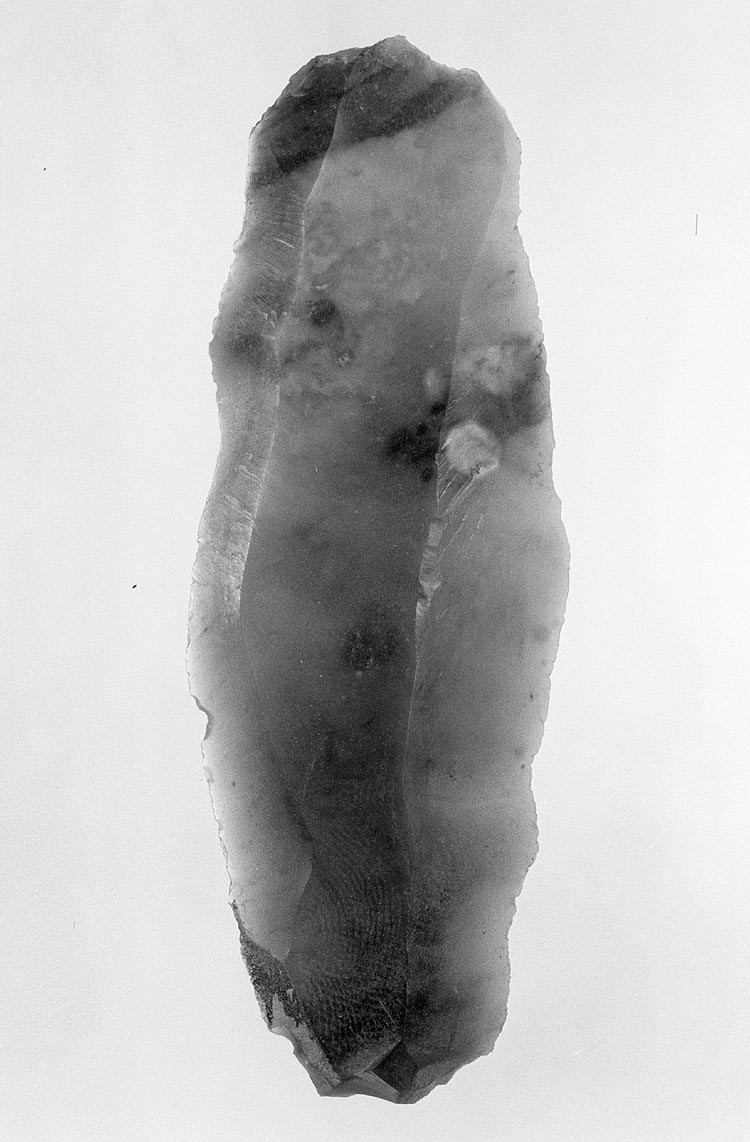
Flint blade, grave D19

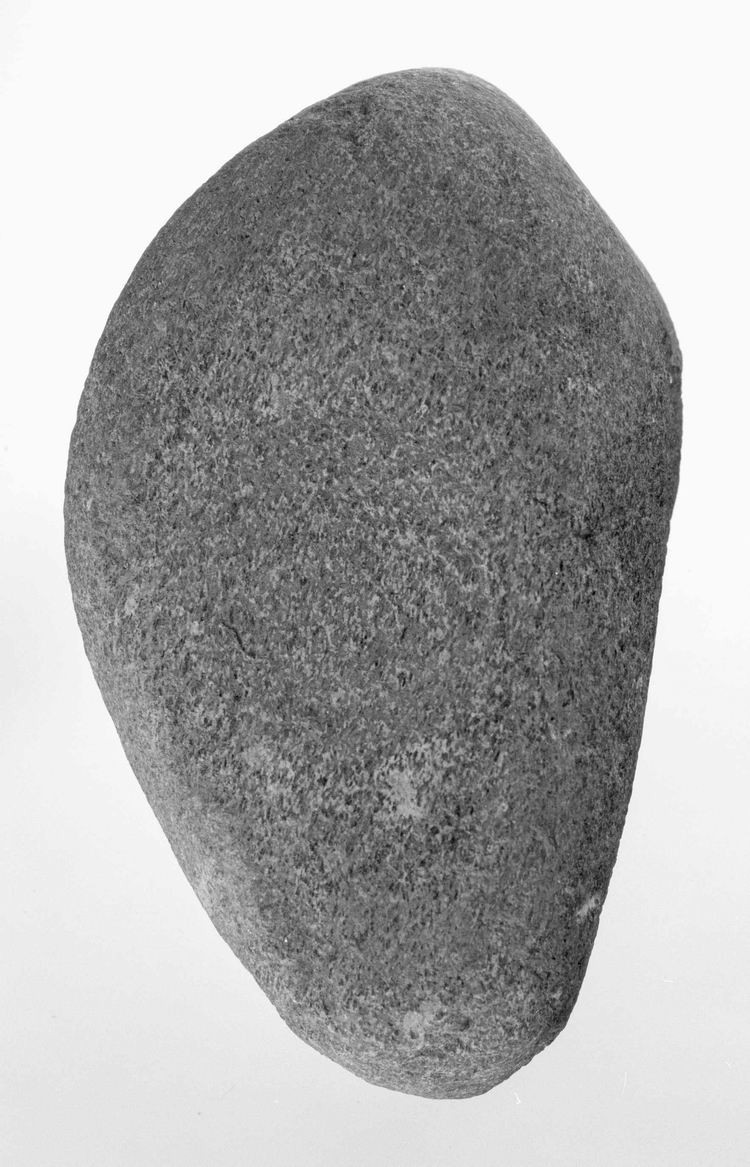
Stone hammer, grave D43

=== Jewelry ===
Amber beads are the most prevalent type of jewelry discovered. Occasionally, beads crafted from jet and quartz and pendants crafted from perforated fossils are also unearthed.

Jewelry

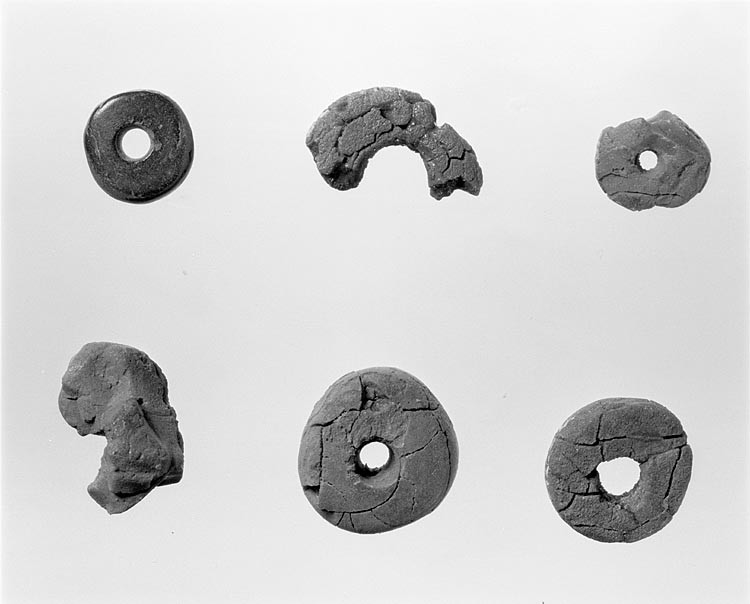
Amber beads, grave D19

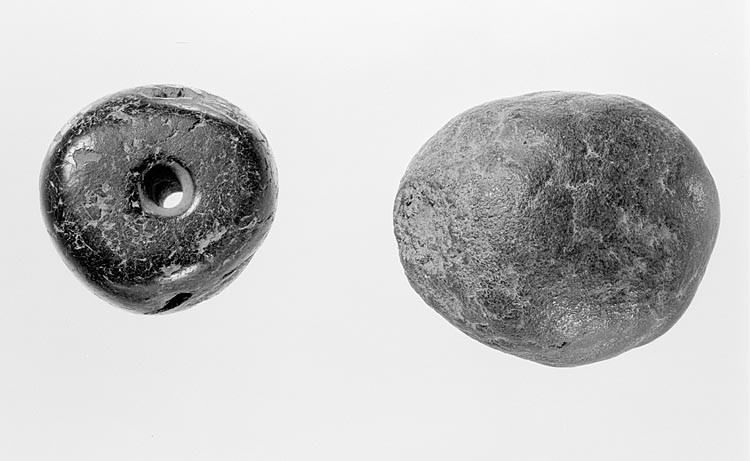
Jet bead, grave D19

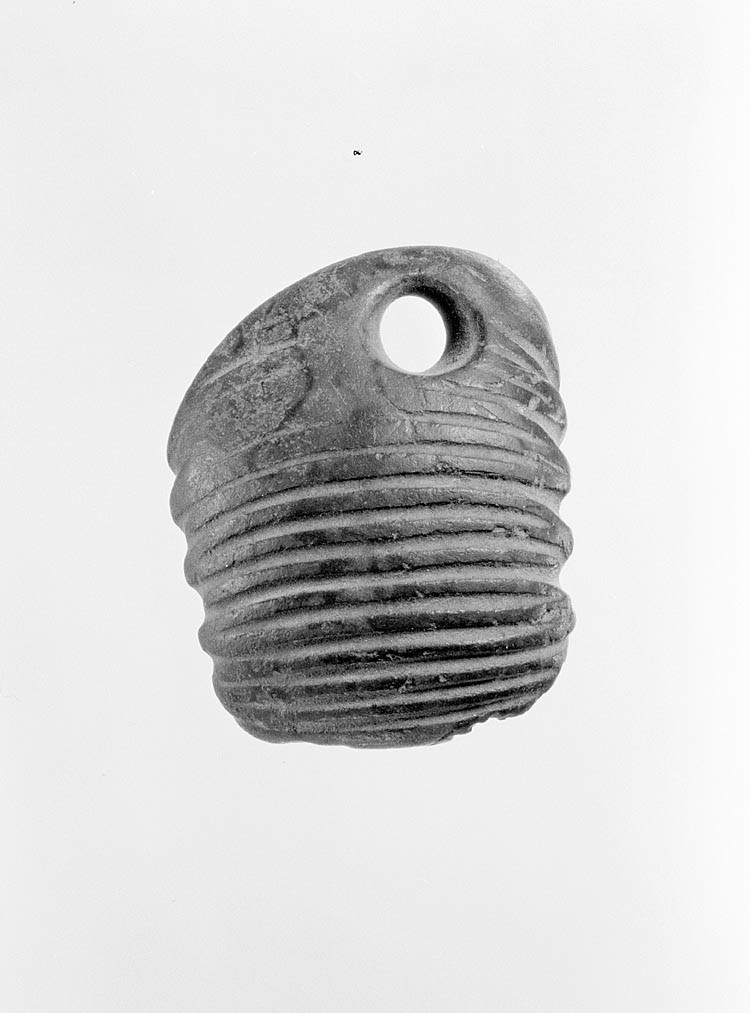
Perforated trilobite, grave D43

=== Metal ===
The discovery of metal objects is a rare occurrence. In the Drouwen 1 megalithic tomb (D19), strips were found, while spirals were discovered in the Buinen 1 megalithic tomb (D28). Additionally, a sheet of copper or arsenical bronze was uncovered in the Wapse megalithic tomb (D52a). These are the oldest metal finds in the Netherlands.

Metal findings

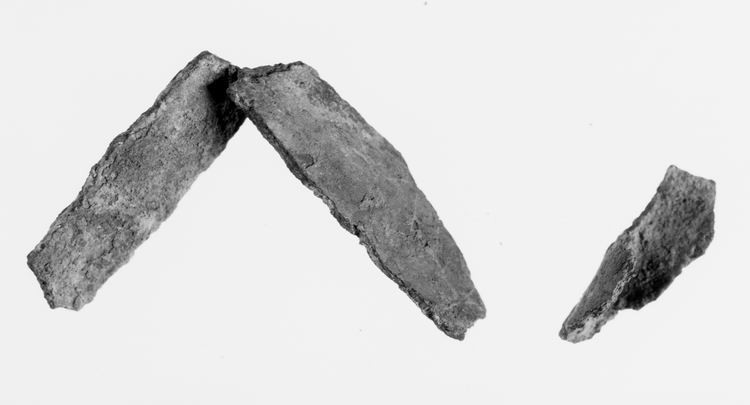
Bronze fragments, grave D19

=== Animal bones ===
The remains of burnt animal bones were discovered in 20 megalithic tombs. These included bones from domestic pigs, cattle, sheep/goats, horses, canids, bears, red deer, and possibly roe deer. It is likely that these bones were used as tools, although at least one bone seems to have been used as a food offering. Given that only claws were recovered from the bear, it is possible that the remains represent the cremated remains of a bearskin with which a person may have been wrapped.

== Laying down in front of the graves ==
The discovery of Funnelbeaker pottery vessels and stone tools in front of the entrances to several megalithic tombs, including the Drouwenerveld megalithic tomb (D26) and the Eexterhalte megalithic tomb (D14), indicates that these items were deposited in these locations at a specific point in time. The removal of the mounds of the two megalithic tombs near Midlaren (D3 and D4) around 1870 may have uncovered corresponding ritual pits, though these were not recognized as such. The pottery is of similar quality and style to that found in the burial chambers and dates to the same period. However, storage vessels and baking plates as well as flint scrapers are absent from the deposits.

== Dating of the Funnelbeaker Period phases of use ==
The range of forms and decoration of the ceramic vessels allows for the distinction of several typological stages within the Western Group of Funnelbeakers. These stages also indicate different phases of use of the megalithic tombs. The subject was previously studied by Heinz Knöll and Jan Albert Bakker, who conducted important earlier work in this field. The typological system that is still relevant today was developed by Anna L. Brindley in the 1980s. By comparing a substantial quantity of carbon-14 dating, Moritz Mennenga was able to present the most precise absolute chronological dating of these stages to date in 2017.

Typological stages of the Funnelbeaker West Group and absolute chronological dating
Horizon	Brindley	Time span	Mennenga	Time span
1	3350–3300 BC	ca. 50 Years	3470–3300 BC	ca. 200 Years
2	3300–3250 BC	ca. 50 Years	3470–3300 BC	ca. 200 Years
3	3250–3125 BC	ca. 125 Years	3300–3250 BC	ca. 50 Years
4	3125–2975 BC	ca. 150 Years	3250–3190 BC	ca. 60 Years
5	2975–2850 BC	ca. 125 Years	3190–3075 BC	ca. 115 Years
6	2850–2800 BC	ca. 50 Years	3075–2860 BC	ca. 215 Years
7	2800–2750 BC	ca. 50 Years	2860–2760 BC	ca. 100 Years

Level 1 pottery was discovered in five graves, representing the earliest archaeological material recovered. These graves were small enclosures with two to five pairs of wall stones, chamber lengths between 2.7 and 6.1 meters, round or oval mounds without enclosures, and an entrance with a pair of passage stones or without passage stones. Seven or eight additional graves were constructed during Stage 2. Some of these graves also contained small chambers, while others had larger chambers with up to seven pairs of wall stones and lengths of up to 12.4 m. The Drouwenerveld megalithic tomb (D26) and the Emmen-Schimmeres megalithic tomb (D43), which has two burial chambers, are the first graves to have a stone enclosure. All other graves of this level still have a mound without an enclosure. The peak of the construction of the megalithic tombs falls on level 3. In 13 tombs, the corresponding pottery represents the oldest found material. Both small and large enclosures continued to be erected. The chambers now had up to ten pairs of wall stones and were up to 17 m long. Mounds were constructed with or without enclosures, and the entrances had zero to two pairs of wall stones. No new megalithic tombs appear to have been erected after level 3. However, large quantities of pottery provide evidence for the continued use of almost all sites up to level 5, after which many graves were abandoned. Pottery from levels 6 and 7 was only found in a few sites. Furthermore, there is evidence of an interruption in the use of some graves. For instance, the destroyed large stone tomb Glimmen 1 (G2) was utilized during levels 3–5, abandoned in level 6, and then reused in level 7.

== Subsequent use of the graves ==
=== Late Neolithic and Early Bronze Age ===
==== Funerals ====
In the majority of Dutch megalithic graves, vessels and stone tools from the Single Grave Culture and the Bell Beaker Culture (both Late Neolithic) and the Early Bronze Age coiled cord pottery were discovered in addition to the Funnel Beaker Period grave goods. These findings are typically regarded as grave goods from secondary burials. What is noteworthy is that in addition to the typical burial pottery of this period, large amphorae and storage vessels were also discovered, which are otherwise only known from settlements. However, these are almost completely absent from individual graves. Therefore, it can be inferred that the megalithic tombs were utilized for special burials.

==== Shell stones ====
In prehistoric times, small circular bowls were attached to several megalithic tombs in the Netherlands. During an investigation in 2018, Mette van de Merwe identified seven sites in which such carvings were present. In five cases, the small bowls are located on capstones, in one case on a wall stone, and in another case on an enclosure stone. The exact purpose of these bowls is unknown. Furthermore, there are no concrete indications as to their date in the Dutch graves. Therefore, a comparison with other regions is necessary. In his investigations of the megalithic graves in Mecklenburg-Western Pomerania, Ewald Schuldt found no evidence that the bowls there were made by members of the Funnel Beaker Culture. They appear to be rather younger, as in several cases they were discovered in places that were probably only accessible again after a certain period of decay of the burial chambers. In contrast, several large stone graves with small bowls are known from Schleswig-Holstein, which were covered over again in the Late Neolithic and Bronze Age and used for new burials. For Jan Albert Bakker, this evidence suggests that the bowls can probably be dated to the Late Neolithic and Early Bronze Age.

=== Middle Bronze Age to Middle Ages ===
Following the Early Bronze Age, the megalithic tombs appear to have been largely unused, as finds from more recent periods are exceedingly rare. A notched Bronze Age urn was discovered in the destroyed Spier megalithic tomb (D54a). A Middle Bronze Age razor was discovered in the Westenesch-Noord megalithic tomb (D42), while a vessel from the Iron Age Harpstedt group was unearthed in the Drouwenerveld megalithic tomb (D26). In 1750, a Roman silver coin is said to have been found in the Eexterhalte megalithic tomb (D14). In the late 18th century, a boat model was discovered in the Loon megalithic tomb (D15), which is believed to date to the Early Middle Ages. Two similar examples are of unknown origin. It is probable that some early to high medieval vessels were also deposited in megalithic tombs.

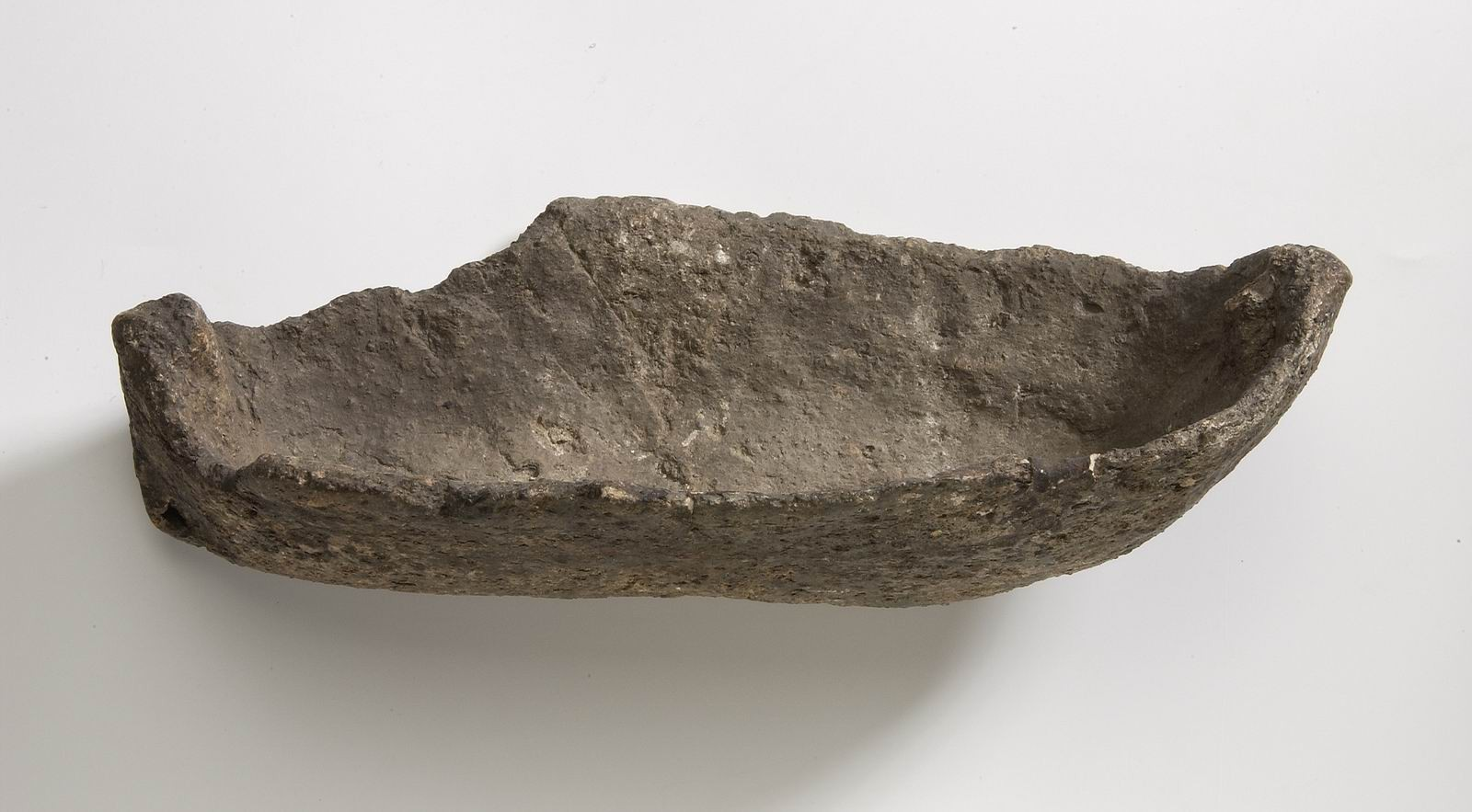
Early medieval boat model, grave D15

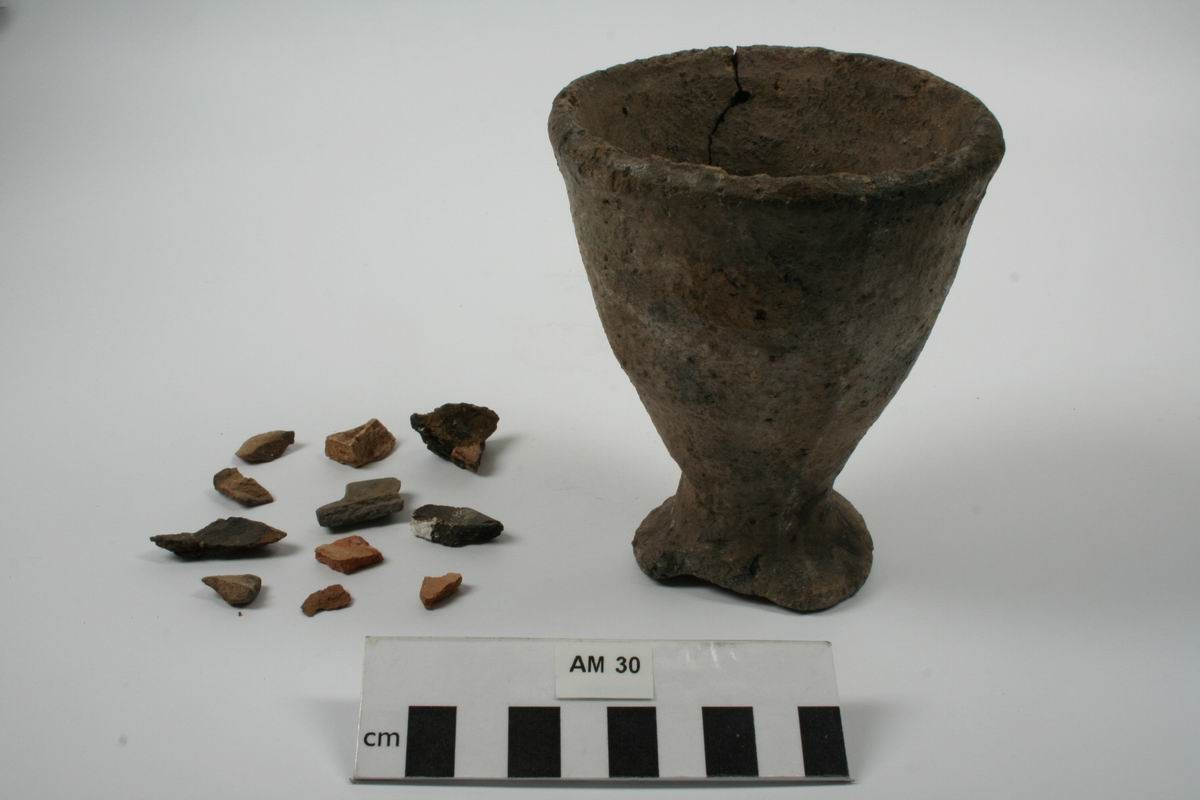
High medieval cup, grave D12 or D13

== Bibliography ==
General overview

- Theo ten Anscher: Een inventarisatie van de documentatie betreffende de Nederlandse hunebedden (= R.A.A.P.-Rapport. Volume 16). Foundation R.A.A.P., Amsterdam 1988 (online).
- Jan Albert Bakker: The TRB West Group. Studies in the Chronology and Geography of the Makers of Hunebeds and Tiefstich Pottery (= Cingula. Volume 5). Universiteit van Amsterdam, Amsterdam 1979, ISBN 978-90-70319-05-2 (online).
- Jan Albert Bakker: A list of the extant and formerly present hunebedden in the Netherlands. In: Palaeohistoria. Volume 30, 1988, p. 63–72 (online).
- Jan Albert Bakker: The Dutch Hunebedden. Megalithic Tombs of the Funnel Beaker Culture. (= International Monographs in Prehistory. Archaeological Series. Volume 2). International Monographs in Prehistory, Ann Arbor 1992, ISBN 1-879621-02-9.
- Jan Albert Bakker: Megalithic Research in the Netherlands, 1547–1911. From 'Giant's Beds' and 'Pillars of Hercules' to accurate investigations, Sidestone Press, Leiden 2010, ISBN 978-90-8890-034-1 (online version).
- Jan Albert Bakker: TRB megalith tombs in the Netherlands. In: Johannes Müller, Martin Hinz, Maria Wunderlich (Ed.): Megaliths – Societies – Landscapes. Early Monumentality and Social Differentiation in Neolithic Europe. Proceedings of the international conference »Megaliths – Societies – Landscapes. Early Monumentality and Social Differentiation in Neolithic Europe« (16th–20th June 2015) in Kiel (= Frühe Monumentalität u. soziale Differenzierung. Volume 18/1). Habelt, Bonn 2019, ISBN 978-3-7749-4213-4, p. 329–343 (online).
- Frits Bom: Eerste nederlandse hunebeddengids. Ankh-Hermes, Deventer; 1978, ISBN 978-90-202-5407-5.
- Augustus Wollaston Franks: The megalithic monuments of the Netherlands and the means taken by the government of that country for their preservation. In: Proceedings of the Society of Antiquaries of London. 2nd series. Volume 5, 1872, p. 258–267.
- Albert Egges van Giffen: De Hunebedden in Nederland. 3 Volumes. Oosthoek, Utrecht 1925–1927.
- Albert Egges van Giffen: Opgravingen in Drente. In: J. Poortman (Ed.): Drente. En handboek voor het kennen van het Drentsche leven in voorbije eeuwen. Volume 1. Boom & Zoon, Meppel 1944, p. 393–568.
- Evert van Ginkel: De Hunebedden. Gids En Geschiedenis Van Nederlands Oudste Monumenten. Drents Museum, Assen 1980, ISBN 978-90-70884-18-5.
- Evert van Ginkel, Sake Jager, Wijnand van der Sanden: Hunebedden. Monumenten van een Steentijdcultuur. Uniepers, Abcoude 2005, ISBN 90-6825-333-6.
- R. H. J. Klok: Hunebedden in Nederland. Zorgen voor morgen. Fibula-Van Dishoeck, Haarlem 1979.
- G. de Leeuw: Onze hunebedden. Gids vor Drentse hunebedden en de Trechterbekerkultuur. Flint 'Nhoes, Borger 1984.
- William Collings Lukis: Report on the hunebedden of Drenthe, Netherlands. In: Proceedings of the Society of Antiquaries of London. 2nd series. Volume 8, 1878, p. 47–55 (online).
- Wijnand van der Sanden, Hans Dekker: Gids voor de hunebedden in Drenthe en Groningen. WBooks, Zwolle 2012, ISBN 978-90-400-0704-0.
- J. Wieringa: Iets over de ligging van de hunebedden op het zuidelijk deel van de Hondsrug. In: Nieuwe Drentse Volksalmanak. 1968, p. 97–114.
- Willem Johannes de Wilde: De hunebedden in Nederland. In: De Kampioen. Volume 27, 1910, p. 242–244, 256–258, 277–280.

Single graves

- Jan Albert Bakker: Het hunebed G1 te Noordlaren. In: Groningse Volksalmanak. 1982–1983 (1983), p. 113–200.
- Jan Albert Bakker: Eine Dolmenflasche und ein Dolmen aus Groningen. In: Jürgen Hoika (Ed.): Beiträge zur frühneolithischen Trichterbecherkultur im westlichen Ostseegebiet. 1. Internationales Trichterbechersymposium in Schleswig vom 4. bis 7. März 1985 (= Untersuchungen und Materialien zur Steinzeit in Schleswig-Holstein und im Ostseeraum. Volume 1). Wachholz, Neumünster 1994, ISBN 3-529-01844-9, p. 71–78.
- Jan Albert Bakker: Hunebed de Duvelskut bij Rolde. In: Nieuwe Drentse Volksalmanak. Volume 119, 2002, p. 62–94.
- Jan Albert Bakker: De Steen en het Rechthuis van Lage Vuursche. In: Tussen Vecht en Eem. Volume 23, 2005, p. 221–231 (PDF; 8,5 MB).
- Jan Albert Bakker: Augustus 1856: George ten Berge tekent de hunebedden bij Schoonoord, Noord-Sleen en Rolde. In: Nieuwe Drentse Volksalmanak. Volume 129, 2012, p. 211–223.
- J. Boeles: Het hunebed te Noordlaren. In: Groningse Volksalmanak voor 1845. 1844, p. 33–47.
- H. Bouman: Twee vernielde Hunebedden te Hooghalen. Dissertation, Groningen 1985.
- W. A. Braakman: De verdwenen hunebedden van de Eese. In: Westerheem. Het tijdschrift voor de Nederlandse archeologie. 2013, p. 2–7 (online).
- Anna L. Brindley: The Finds from Hunebed G3 on the Glimmer Es, mun. of Haren, province of Groningen, The Netherlands. In: Helinium. Volume 23, 1983, p. 209–216 (online).
- Anna L. Brindley: Hunebed G2: excavation and finds. In: Palaeohistoria. Volume 28, 1986, p. 27–92 (online).
- Anna L. Brindley: Datering van hunebed 'De Papeloze Kerk' (D49) bij Schoonoord (Dr.), op grond van het aardeverk. In: Paleo-aktueel. Volume 6, 1994, p. 27–29 (online).
- Anna L. Brindley: Meer aardewerk uit D6a/Tinaarlo (Dr). In: Paleo-aktueel. Volume 11, 2000, p. 19–22 (online).
- Anna L. Brindley, Jan N. Lanting: A re-assessment of the hunehedden O1, D30 and D40: structures and finds. In: Palaeohistoria. Volume 33/34 1991/1992 (1992), p. 97–140 (online).
- Anna L. Brindley, Jan N. Lanting, A. D. Neves Espinha: Hunebed D6a near Tinaarlo. In: Palaeohistoria. Volume 43/44, 2001/2002 (2002), p. 43–85 (online).
- Anna L. Brindley, A. D. Neves Espinha: Vroeg TRB-aardewerk uit hunebed D6a bij Tinaarlo (Dr). In: Paleo-aktueel. Volume 10, 1999, p. 21–24 (online).
- Nynke Delsman: Van offer tot opgraving: meer informatie over hunebed D42-Westenesch-Noord (gemeente Emmen). In: Paleo-aktueel. Volume 27, 2016, p. 7–11 (online).
- Albert Egges van Giffen: Mededeeling omtrent onderzoek en restauratie van het Groote Hunebed te Havelte. In: Nieuwe Drentsche Volksalmanak. Volume 37, 1919, p. 109–139.
- Albert Egges van Giffen: De zgn. Eexter grafkelder, hunebed D XIII, te Eext, Gem. Anloo. In: Nieuwe Drentsche Volksalmanak. Volume 61, 1943, p. 103–115.
- Albert Egges van Giffen: Het Ndl. Hunebed (DXXVIII) te Buinen, Gem. Borger, een bijdrage tot de absolute chronologie der Nederlandsche Hunebedden. In: Nieuwe Drentsche Volksalmanak. Volume 61, 1943, p. 115–138.
- Albert Egges van Giffen: De twee vernielde hunebedden, DVIe en DVIf, bij Tinaarloo, Gem. Vries. In: Nieuwe Drentsche Volksalmanak. Volume 62, 1944, p. 93–112.
- Albert Egges van Giffen: Een steenkeldertje, DXIIIa, te Eext, Gem. Anloo. In: Nieuwe Drentsche Volksalmanak. Volume 62, 1944, p. 117–119.
- Albert Egges van Giffen: Twee vernielde hunebedden, DXIIIb en c, te Eext, Gem. Anloo. In: Nieuwe Drentsche Volksalmanak. Volume 62, 1944, p. 119–125.
- Albert Egges van Giffen: Een vernield hunebed DXLIIa, het zoogenaamde Pottiesbargien, in het (vroegere) Wapserveld bij Diever, gem. Diever. In Nieuwe Drentse Volksalmanak. Volume 64, 1946, p. 61–71.
- Albert Egges van Giffen: Het grote hunebed D53. In Nieuwe Drentse Volksalmanak. Volume 69, 1951, p. 102–104.
- Albert Egges van Giffen: Zur Frage der Einheitlichkeit der Hünenbetten. Das Riesen-Großsteinlanggrab bei Emmen, Prov. Drente. In: Peter Zylmann (Ed.): Zur Ur- und Frühgeschichte Nordwestdeutschlands. Neue Untersuchungen aus dem Gebiete zwischen Ijssel u. Ostsee. Festschrift zum 70. Geburtstage von Karl Hermann Jacob-Friesen. Lax, Hildesheim 1956, p. 97–122.
- Albert Egges van Giffen: Een gereconstrueerd hunebed. Het gereconstrueerde ganggraf D49, "De Papeloze Kerk" bij Schoonoord, gem. Sleen, prov. Drente. In: Nieuwe Drentse Volksalmanak. Volume 81, 1961, p. 189–198.
- Albert Egges van Giffen: Restauratie en onderzoek van het langgraf (D43) te Emmen (Dr.). In: Helinium. Volume 2, 1964, p. 104–114.
- Albert Egges van Giffen: De Papeloze kerk. Het gereonstrueerde Rijkshunebed D49 bij Schoonoord, gem. Sleen. Wolters-Noordhoff, Groningen 1969.
- Annelou van Gijn, Joris Geuverink, Jeanet Wiersma, Wouter Verschoof: Hunebed D6 in Tynaarlo (Dr.): méér dan een berg grijze stenen? In: Paleo-aktueel. Volume 22, 2011, p. 38–44 (online).
- Henny A. Groenendijk: De herontdekking van het hunebed op de Onner es. In: Historisch jaarboek Groningen. 2014. p. 138.
- Henny A. Groenendijk, Jan N. Lanting, H. Woldring: Die Suche nach dem verschollenen Großsteingrab G4 'Onner es' (Onnen, Prov. Groningen). In: Palaeohistoria. Volume 55/56, 2013/14, p. 57–84 (online).
- D. J. de Groot: Het Hunebed D9 te Noordlo. In: Paleo-aktueel. Volume 1, 1989, p. 36–39 (online).
- D. J. de Groot: Hunebed D9 at Annen (gemeente Anlo, province of Drenthe, the Netherlands). In: Palaeohistoria. Volume 30, 1988, p. 73–108 (online).
- Jan Hendrik Holwerda: Opgraving van twee hunnebedden te Drouwen. In: Oudheidkundige Mededelingen uit het Rijksmuseum van Oudheden te Leiden. Volume 7, 1913, p. 29–50.
- Jan Hendrik Holwerda: Zwei Riesenstuben bei Drouwen (Prov. Drente) in Holland. In: Prähistorische Zeitschrift. Volume 5, 1913, p. 435–448.
- Jan Hendrik Holwerda: Das große Steingrab bei Emmen (Prov. Drente) in Holland. In: Prähistorische Zeitschrift. Volume 6, 1914, p. 57–67.
- Eva C. Hopman: A biography of D49, the "Papeloze Kerk" (Schoonoord, Dr.). 2011 (online).
- B. Kamlag: Hunebed D32d de Odoorn. Dissertation, Groningen 1988.
- Albert E. Lanting: Van heinde en ver? Een opmerkelijke pot uit hunebed D21 te Bronneger, gem. Borger. In Nieuwe Drentse Volksalmanak. Volume 100, 1983, p. 139–146.
- Jan N. Lanting: De hunebedden op de Glimmer Es (gem. Haren). In: Groningse Volksalmanak. 1974–1975 (1975), p. 167–180.
- Jan N. Lanting: Het na-onderzoek van het vernielde hunebed D31a bij Exlo (Dr.). In: Paleo-Aktueel. Volume 5, 1994, S. 39–42 (online).
- Jan N. Lanting: Het zogenaamde hunebed van Rijs (Fr.). In: Paleo-Aktueel. Volume 8, 1997, p. 47–50 (online).
- Jan N. Lanting: Wat is er werkelijk bekend over Hunebed D12, respektievelijk de schreden en kompasrichtingen bij Van Lier? In: Jan N. Lanting: Kritische nabeschouwingen. Barkhuis, Groningen 2015, ISBN 978-94-91431-81-4, p. 65–88.
- Jan N. Lanting, Anna L. Brindley: The destroyed hunebed O2 and the adjacent TRB flat cemetery at Mander (Gem. Tubbergen, province Overijssel). In: Palaeohistoria. Volume 45/46, 2003/2004 (2004), p. 59–94 (online).
- W. Meeüsen: Het verdwenen hunebed D54a bij Spier, gem. Beilen. Dissertation, Groningen 1983.
- Pieter J. R. Modderman: Beaker Pottery from Hunebed D19 near Drouwen, Prov. Drenthe. In: Analecta Praehistorica Leidensia. Volume 4, 1971, p. 47–51 (PDF; 2,24 MB).
- J. Molema: Het verdwenen hunebed D43a op de Emmer Es te Emmen. Dissertation, Groningen 1987.
- Jan Willem Okken: De verhinderde verkoop van hunebedden te Rolde, 1847–1848. In: Nieuwe Drentse Volksalmanak. Volume 106, 1989, p. 74–86.
- Daan Raemaekers, Sander Jansen: Een papieren opgraving van hunebed D12 Eexteres. Van ganggraf naar dolmen. In: Paleo-aktueel. Volume 24, 2013, p. 43–50 (online).
- Wijnand van der Sanden: Reuzenstenen op de es. De Hunebedden van Rolde. Waanders, Zwolle 2007, ISBN 978-90-400-8367-9.
- Wijnand van der Sanden: Een hunebed in een park – Een bijdrage tot de biografie van het grote hunebed van Borger. In: Waardeel. Volume 31 (1), 2011, p. 1–5 (online).
- C. W. Staal-Lugten: Die verzierte TRB-Keramik des Hünenbettes D19 in Drouwen, Prov. Drenthe. In: Analecta Praehistorica Leidensia. Volume 9, 1976, p. 19–37 (online).
- Ernst Taayke: Drie vernielde hunebedden in de gemeente Odoorn. In: Nieuwe Drentsche Volksalmanak. Volume 102, 1985, p. 125–144.
- Adrie Ufkes: De inventarisatie van Hunebed O2 van Mander. Dissertation, Groningen 1992.
- Adrie Ufkes: Het hunebed O2 bij Mander (OV.). In: Paleo-aktueel. Volume 4, 1992, p. 31–32 (online).
- Adrie Ufkes: Trechterbekeraardewerk uit het hunebed D52 te Diever, gemeente Westerveld (Dr.). Een beschrijving van een particuliere collectie (= ARC-Rapporten. Volume 2007–20). ARC, Groningen 2007 ISSN 1574-6887(online).

Special studies

- Wout Arentzen: W.J. de Wilde (1860–1936). Een vergeten onderzoeker van de Nederlandse hunebedden. Sidestone Press, Leiden 2010, ISBN 978-90-8890-060-0 (online).
- Wout Arentzen: Nicolaus Westendorp (1773 – 1836). Een dominee op zoek naar 't begin van 't Vaderlands Verleden. Sidestone Press, Leiden 2022, ISBN 978-94-6426-110-3 (online).
- Jan Albert Bakker: July 1878: Lukis and Dryden in Drente. In: The Antiquaries Journal. Volume 54/1, 1979, p. 9–18.
- Jan Albert Bakker: Protection, acquisition, restoration and maintenance of the Dutch hunebeds since 1734. An active and often exemplary policy in Drenthe (I). In: Berichten van de Rijksdienst voor het Oudheidkundig Bodemonderzoek. Volume 29, 1979, p. 143–183 (online).
- Jan Albert Bakker: De opgraving in het Grote Hunebed te Borger door Titia Brongersma op 11 juni 1685. In: Nieuwe Drentse Volksalmanak. Volume 101, 1984, p. 103–116.
- Jan Albert Bakker: Petrus en Adriaan Camper en de hunebedden. In: J. Schuller tot Peursum-Meijer, Willem Roelf Henderikus Koops (Ed.): Petrus Camper (1722 - 1789). Onderzoeker van nature. Universiteitsmuseum, Groningen 1989, ISBN 90-367-0153-8, p. 189–198.
- Jan Albert Bakker: Prehistory Visualised: Hunebedden on Dutch School Pictures as a Reflection of Contemporary Research and Society. In: Berichten van de Rijksdienst voor het Oudheidkundig Bodemonderzoek. Volume 40, 1992, p. 29–71 (online).
- Jan Albert Bakker: Chronicle of megalith research in the Netherlands, 1547–1900: from giants and a Devil's Cunt to accurate recording. In: Magdalena Midgley (Ed.): Antiquarians at the Megaliths (= BAR International series. Band 1956). Archaeopress, Oxford 2009, ISBN 978-1-4073-0439-7, p. 7–22.
- Jan Albert Bakker, Willy Groenman-van Waateringe: Megaliths, soils and vegetation on the Drenthe Plateau. In: Willy Groenman-van Waateringe, M. Robinson (Ed.): Man-made Soils (= Symposia of the Association for Environmental Archaeology. Volume 6 = BAR International Series. Volume 410). B.A.R., Oxford 1988, ISBN 0-86054-529-6, p. 143–181.
- Jaap Beuker: Von Schiffsbohrwurm zum Hunebed Highway. Schutz und touristische Erschließung der niederländischen Megalithgräber. In: Nachrichten des Marschenrates zur Förderung der Forschung im Küstengebiet der Nordsee. Volume 57, 2020, p. 50–56 (online).
- Anna L. Brindley: The typochronology of TRB West Group pottery. In: Palaeohistoria. Volume 28, 1986, p. 93–132 (online).
- Anna L. Brindley: The use of pottery in dutch hunebedden. In: Alex Gibson (Ed.): Prehistoric Pottery: People pattern and purpose (= British Archaeological Reports. Volume 1156). Archaeopress, Oxford 2003, ISBN 1-84171-526-3, p. 43–51 (online).
- A. César Gonzalez-Garcia, Lourdes Costa-Ferrer: Orientations of the Dutch Hunebedden. In: Journal for the History of Astronomy. Volume 34/2, No. 115, 2003, p. 219–226 (online).
- Rainer Kossian: Nichtmegalithische Grabanlagen der Trichterbecherkultur in Deutschland und in den Niederlanden (= Veröffentlichungen des Landesamtes für Denkmalpflege und Archäologie Sachsen-Anhalt – Landesmuseum für Vorgeschichte. Volume 58). 2 volumes. State Office for Monument Preservation and Archaeology Saxony-Anhalt - State Museum of Prehistory, Halle (Saale) 2005, ISBN 3-910010-84-9.
- Mette van de Merwe: Een zoektocht naar cup marks op de Nederlandse hunebedden. Saxion Hogeschool, Deventer 2019 (PDF; 20,4 MB).
- Jan Willem Okken: Mr. L. Oldenhuis Gratama en het behoud van de hunebedden. In: Nieuwe Drentse Volksalmanak. Volume 107, 1990, p. 66–95.
- Wijnand van der Sanden: In het spoor van Lukis en Dryden. Twee Engelse oudheidkundigen tekenen Drentse hunebedden in 1878. Matrijs, Utrecht 2015, ISBN 978-90-5345-471-8.
- Roel Sanders: De oriëntatie van hunebedden Zon, maan of sterren? In: Waardeel. Volume 33 (3), 2013, p. 14–16 (online).
- Elisabeth Schlicht: Kupferschmuck aus Megalithgräbern Nordwestdeutschlands. In: Nachrichten aus Niedersachsens Urgeschichte. Volume 42, 1973, p. 13–52 (online).
- Nynke de Vries: Excavating the Elite? Social stratification based on cremated remains in the Dutch hunebedden. Masterarbeit, Groningen 2015 (online).

== Movies ==
- Alun Harvey: Dutch Dolmens. Hunebedcentrum, Borger 2021. In: YouTube. April 23, 2021, retrieved on May 20, 2021.
- Dutch Dolmens, Skeletal Remains of Burial Mounds. History and Excavation. Drenthe, Netherlands. History With Kayleigh, 2020. In: YouTube. June 23, 2020, retrieved on October 6, 2021.
