= Jan Albert Bakker =

Dutch archeologist (born 1935)

Jan Albert Bakker (born 4 June 1935, Breda) is a Dutch archeologist. He is an emeritus lecturer of Prehistoric Archaeology of Northwestern Europe at the University of Amsterdam, where he worked at the Institute for Prae- and Protohistory. His field of expertise is the Funnelbeaker culture and the Dutch dolmen called hunebeds.

Bakker obtained his PhD from the University of Amsterdam in 1973 under Willem Glasbergen with a thesis titled: "Westgroep van de trechterbekercultuur : studies over chronologie en geografie van de makers van hunebedden en diepsteekceramiek, ten westen van de Elbe". He later started working as lecturer at the same university. He retired in 2000. He was one of the researchers who worked on a hunebed near the village of Drouwen between 1968 and 1970, this was the last hunebed to be excavated in the Netherlands.

Bakker became a member of the Royal Netherlands Academy of Arts and Sciences in 1990.

== Publications ==
- The TRB Westgroup, Studies in the Chronology and Geography of the Makers of Hunebeds and Tiefstich Pottery, Amsterdam, 1979/2009.
- Megalithic Research in the Netherlands, 1547-1911: From ‘Giant’s Beds’ and ‘Pillars of Hercules’ to accurate investigations, 2010.
