= Members of the Royal Netherlands Academy of Arts and Sciences (B) =

The Royal Netherlands Academy of Arts and Sciences (Dutch: Koninklijke Nederlandse Akademie van Wetenschappen, abbreviated KNAW) is an organization dedicated to the advancement of science and literature in the Netherlands. The academy is housed in the Trippenhuis in Amsterdam. Founded in 1808, members are appointed for life by co-optation.

== List of members (B) ==
Name	Type	Division	Date of election	Notes	Ref.
Walter H.W. Baade	Foreign Member		1953		
Hein de Baar	Member	Natural Sciences and Engineering	2010		
Tjitze Baarda	Member		1982		
Willem Baarda	Member		1971		
Marie Johannes van Baarda	Corresponding Member		1906	Resigned 1922	
Pieter Baas	Member	Natural Sciences and Engineering	2000		
Lourens Gerhard Marinus Baas Becking					
F.H. Bach	Foreign Member		1987		
Alfred Gustave Herbert (Fred) Bachrach	Member		1970		
Hilmar Johannes Backer	Member		1950		
Nicolaas Pieter Badenhuizen	Corresponding member		1961		
Jacob Badon Ghijben					
George Frederik Willem Baehr					
Karl Ernst Ritter von Baer	Foreign Member		1875		
Gerard Baerends	Member		1958		
Jan Baerends	Member	Natural Sciences and Engineering	2004		
John Bake					
Arnold Adriaan Bake	Corresponding Member		1947		
Marian Bakermans-Kranenburg	Member	Behavioural Sciences, Social Sciences and Law	2012		
Hendrik Willem Bakhuis Roozeboom	Member		1890		
Reinier Cornelis Bakhuizen van den Brink	Member		1855		
Jan Nicolaas Bakhuizen van den Brink	Member		1950		
Cornelis Jan Bakker					
Egbert Bakker	Corresponding Member		1999		
Gerbrand Bakker					
Huib Bakker	Member	Natural Sciences and Engineering	2015		
Jan Albert Bakker	Member		1990		
J.W. de Bakker	Member		1989		
K. Bakker	Member		1982		
Erik Bakkers	Member	Natural Sciences and Engineering	2020		
Rudy Ballieux	Member	Medical, Biomedical and Health Sciences	1991		
Obbe Sikkes Bangma					
Sir Joseph Banks					
Jean Denis Barbié du Bocage					
C.A.C. Barbier de Meynard	Foreign Member		1895		
Henk Barendregt	Member	Natural Sciences and Engineering	1997		
René Barents	Corresponding Member	Behavioural Sciences, Social Sciences and Law	1995		
Wolfgang Bargmann	Foreign Member		1976		
Willem van Barneveld					
Adriaan Jacob Barnouw	Corresponding Member		1923	Resigned 1940	
Anton Peter Barten	Corresponding Member		1984		
Auguste Barth	Foreign Member		1896		
Else M. Barth	Member		1978		
Renate Bartsch	Member	Humanities	2000		
Jan Steffen Bartstra	Member		1952		
Martinus Jean de Bast					
Liévain Armand Marie de Bast					
Marcel Bataillon	Foreign Member		1964		
Jurjen Battjes	Member	Natural Sciences and Engineering	1975		
Walter Baumgartner	Foreign Member		1951		
Edouard Henri von Baumhauer	Member		1858		
Nicolaas Baur			1809		
Frank Baur	Foreign Member		1946		
Bas van Bavel	Member	Humanities	2013		
Herman Bavinck	Member		1906		
Sir Frederick C. Bawden, F.R.S.	Foreign Member		1961		
Adriaan Bax	Corresponding Member	Natural Sciences and Engineering	1994		
Dirk Bax	Corresponding Member		1950		
Jean-Baptiste de Bay			1849	Resigned 1851	
Willem Hendrik de Beaufort (2)	Member		1896		
Jacques Beckers	Corresponding Member	Natural Sciences and Engineering	1989		
Johann Beckmann			1809		
Antoine César Becquerel			1836		
Jan Frederik van Beeck Calkoen			1808		
Albertus van Beek			1825		
Bram van de Beek	Member	Humanities	1997		
Robert S. P. Beekes	Member		1993		
Jacob Houdijn Beekhuis	Member		1959		
A. Beeloo			1848	Resigned 1851	
Carlo Beenakker	Member	Natural Sciences and Engineering	2002		
Joannes Josephus Maria Beenakker	Member		1978		
Ludwig van Beethoven					
Nicolaas Beets					
Th.H. Behrens					
Martinus Willem Beijerinck					
Jos Beijnen					
Georg-Joseph Bekker					
Harold Bekkering					
D.W. van Bekkum					
Herman van Bekkum					
Wout van Bekkum					
Johannes Waltherus Franciscus Beks					
Cornelis Bellaar Spruyt					
Folkert Oene Belzer					
Jan van Bemmel					
Johan Frans van Bemmelen					
Jacob Maarten van Bemmelen					
Willem van Bemmelen					
Abraham van Bemmelen (1)					
Zvi Ben-Avraham	Foreign Member				
Johannes Christiaan Bendorp					
Pierre-joseph van Beneden					
Jan Arnold Bennet					
Jozien Bensing					
Johan van Benthem					
Gerard van den Berg	Corresponding Member				
N.P. van den Berg					
Albert van den Berg					
Cornelis Christiaan Berg					
Leonard van den Berg					
J.E.J. van den Berg					
Franciscus Johannes van den Berg					
L.W.C. van den Berg					
André Berger	Foreign Member				
Laurens Philippe Charles van den Bergh					
Heinrich Karl Wilhelm Berghaus					
Pieter Adriaan Bergsma					
Jan Bergstra					
Piet Bergveld					
Klaas van Berkel					
Guus Berkhout					
Gerrit Cornelis Berkouwer					
Hendrik Petrus Berlage, jr.					
Jean Bernard					
Josephus Christophorus Bernardus Bernard					
René Bernards					
J.C. Bernelot Moens					
A.J. Bernet Kempers					
Ton Berns					
G.H. Bernstein					
J.G. Bertelman					
Michael Berry	Foreign Member				
M. Berthelot					
Claude-Louis Berthollet					
G. Bertrand					
C.C. Bervic					
Jöns Jacob Berzelius					
Friedrich Wilhelm Bessel					
J.F. (Hans) Besseling					
C.H. Best					
Evert Willem Beth					
Johannes in de Betouw					
Charles van Beveren					
Hugo Beyerman					
Connie Bezzina					
Jan Bialostocki					
Ranuccio Bianchi Badinelli					
Peter J. Bickel	Foreign Member				
David Bierens de Haan					
Cornelis Benjamin Biezeno					
Catrien Bijleveld					
Karin Bijsterveld					
Johannes Martin Bijvoet					
Willem Bilderdijk					
B. Biondelli					
Byron Bird	Foreign Member				
Peter Brian Herrenden Birks					
J.M.F. Birnbaum					
T.L.W. von Bischoff					
Ton Bisseling					
Alfons van Blaaderen					
Adriaan Blaauw					
A.H. Blaauw					
Gerrit Anne Blaauw					
Colin Blakemore	Foreign Member				
E. Blancquart					
Arie Blanken, Jansz.					
G.H. Blanken					
Jan Blanken, Jansz.					
George Blasse					
Mark Blaug					
Pieter Bleeker					
Johan Bleeker					
W. Bleeker					
Clemens van Blitterswijk					
F. Bloch					
Wim Blockmans					
Bas Bloem					
Auke Reitze Bloembergen					
Nicolaas Bloembergen					
Dirk Peter Blok					
Josine Blok					
Petrus Johannes Blok					
D. Blom					
Kees Blom					
Carel Blotkamp					
Carl Ludwig Blume					
Johann Friedrich Blumenbach					
J.C. Bluntschli					
W. von Bode					
Joachim Bodel					
J.T. Bodel Nyenhuis					
Geoffrey Bodenhausen	Corresponding Member				
Henk Bodewitz					
August Boeckh					
Monique Boekaerts					
Jan Boeke					
J.H. Boeke					
Ted de Boer					
Th.J. de Boer					
W. den Boer					
Tj. de Boer					
R.C. Boer					
J.H. de Boer					
C. de Boer (2)					
J. de Boer					
J. Boerema					
I. Boerema					
P.C. Boeren					
Jacob Gijsbert Boerlage					
Hans Boersma					
J. Böeseken					
Pieter Alexander van Boetzelaer					
Adrianus Bogaers					
N.H.D. Bohr					
H.E.J.G. du Bois					
E. du Bois Reymond					
U.Ph. Boissevain					
J.F. Boissonade					
Bart Jan Bok					
Siegfried Thomas Bok					
J. Boldingh					
Lambertus van Bolhuis					
Lodewijk Bolk					
H. Bolkestein					
L. Boltzmann					
Klaas Bom					
Seeger Adrianus Bonebakker					
R.T.H.P.L.A. van Boneval Faure					
John Bongaarts	Corresponding Member				
Andreas Bonn					
C. Bonne					
Johannes Adrianus Boogaard					
J.C. Boogman					
J.H. van Boom					
Dorret Boomsma					
K.G. Boon					
Anthony Hendrik van der Boon Mesch					
Hendrik Carel van der Boon Mesch					
Arnoud Boot					
Johan Cornelis Gerard Boot					
Dick Bootsma					
F. Bopp					
A.Ph.R.C. van der Borch van Verwolde					
Elias Annes Borger					
Joris Frans Borghouts					
J. Borgman					
J.A. Bornewasser					
Th.J.H. Borret					
René de Borst					
Piet Borst					
Hans Bos					
W.H. van den Bos					
J. Bosboom					
Antal van den Bosch					
Bernardus de Bosch					
Frederik David Kan Bosch					
Jeronimo de Bosch					
Johannes van den Bosch					
Leendert Bosch					
R.B. van den Bosch					
Jeronimo de Bosch Kemper					
Hilbrand Boschma					
J.H.A. Bosquet					
Herman Bosscha					
Pieter Bosscha, (*1788)					
Johannes Bosscha (1)					
Johannes Bosscha (2)					
Johannes Bosscha (3)					
Fréd Bosman	Corresponding Member				
J. Bosworth					
C.A. Böttiger					
Herman Bouma					
Johan Bouma					
Joop Bouma					
A.C. Bouman					
Maarten A. Bouman					
Carlijn Bouten					
Friedrich Ludewig Bouterweck					
Christoffel Jacob Bouwkamp					
Harro Bouwmeester					
Joke Bouwstra					
Lans Bovenberg					
Mark Bovens					
J. Bowring					
C.R. Boxer					
Henk Braakhuis					
Joseph Braat					
J.P. Braempt					
Paul Brakefield	Foreign Member				
J.L.A. Brandes					
J.C. Brandt Corstius					
Antoni Brants					
Gerrit Bras					
Jacob Gijsbert Samuel van Breda					
G. Bredig					
Abraham Bredius					
Mattheus Ignatius van Bree					
J.B. van Bree					
Ferry Breedveld					
Nico van Breemen					
Douwe Breimer					
Jan Breman					
C.E.B. Bremekamp					
Monique Breteler	Foreign Member				
W.G. Brill					
Jan ten Brink					
Marcel van den Brink	Foreign Member				
Laurens Jan Brinkhorst	Corresponding Member				
Henk Brinkhuis					
H. Brinkman					
R. Brinkman					
Albert ten Broecke Hoekstra					
Roel van den Broek					
Michiel van den Broeke					
Dick Broer					
Henk Broer					
Willem Broes					
J.J. Broeze					
F.J.A. Broeze					
G. Brom					
Gerard B. Brom					
Albertus Brondgeest					
L.D. Brongersma					
Johannes Bronkhorst	Corresponding Member				
W. Bronkhorst					
Fred Brooks	Foreign Member				
R. Brouwer					
D. Brouwer					
Luitzen E.J. Brouwer					
H.A. Brouwer					
B. Brouwer					
Peter Brown	Foreign Member				
R. Brown					
S.L. Brug					
Pibo Antonius Brugmans					
H. Brugmans					
Izaak Johannes Brugmans					
Sebald Justinus Brugmans (2)					
Nicolaas Govert de Bruijn					
C.F.A. Bruijning					
C.C. de Bruin					
Jan Frederik Gerrit Brumund					
Bert Brunekreef					
Coenraad Lodewijk Brunings					
Christiaan Brunings (2)					
H. Brunner					
Han Brunner					
F. Brunot					
P.M. Brutel de la Rivière					
Josua Bruyn					
H.E. Bruyn					
E. de Bruyne					
F. Bücheler					
F.S.P. van Buchem					
D.D. Büchler					
A. de Buck					
Henk Buck					
B. Budiansky					
Kenneth Buesseler	Foreign Member				
E.S. Bugge					
Henk Buhrman					
M.P. van Buijtenen					
Piet Buijnsters					
J.A.B. van Buitenen					
Willem Buiter	Corresponding Member				
Harry Büller					
Erwin Bulte					
Wiep van Bunge					
H.G. Bungenberg de Jong					
C.K.J. von Bunsen					
William Burck					
Martin van Buren					
C.L. van der Burg					
Wilhelm Gerard Burgers					
Johannes Martinus Burgers					
Marten Burkens					
F.X. de Burtin					
Marcus Jan Busch					
Joost Businger	Corresponding Member				
C.H.Th. Bussemaker					
Johannes Wilhelmus Bussingh					
Harvey Butcher					
Bram Buunk					
J.T. Buys					
Johannes Buys					
Christophorus Henricus Didericus Buys Ballot					
Frederik Jacobus Johannes Buytendijk					
Alexander Willem Byvanck					
