= Bakker =

Bakker (Dutch pronunciation: [ˈbɑ.kər]) is a common Dutch surname equivalent to English Baker. In 2007 it was the seventh most common name in the Netherlands (55,273 people). Notable people with the surname include:

== Bakker ==
- Ada Bakker (b. 1948), Dutch tennis player
- Alexander Hugo Bakker Korff (1824–1882), Dutch genre painter
- Anneke B. Mulder-Bakker (b. 1940), Dutch medievalist
- Arnold Bakker (b. 1964), Dutch psychologist
- Arne Bakker (1930–2009), Norwegian footballer
- Bert Bakker (1912–1969), Dutch writer and publisher
- Billy Bakker (b. 1988), Dutch field hockey player
- Cees Bakker (b. 1945), Dutch football referee
- Cor Bakker (cyclist) (1918–2011), Dutch racing cyclist
- Cor Bakker (b. 1961), Dutch pianist
- Cornelis Bakker (1904–1960), Dutch nuclear physicist, Director-General of CERN 1955–1960
- Corrie Bakker (b. 1945), Dutch sprinter
- Danny Bakker (footballer, born 16 January 1995), Dutch footballer
- Danny Bakker (footballer, born 25 January 1995), Dutch footballer
- Davy Bakker (b. 1972), Dutch cricketer
- Dick Bakker (b. 1947), Dutch composer, conductor and music producer
- Donald Bakker, Canadian convicted of sex tourism
- Edwin Bakker (b. 1967), Dutch terrorism scholar
- Egbert Bakker (b. 1958), Dutch classical scholar
- Erik Bakker (b. 1990), Dutch footballer
- Ernst Bakker (1946–2014), Dutch politician
- Eshly Bakker (b. 1993), Dutch footballer
- Geert Bakker (1921–1993), Dutch Olympic sailor
- Gerbrand Bakker (physician) (1771–1828), Dutch physician
- Gerbrand Bakker (novelist) (b. 1962), Dutch novelist
- Gijs Bakker (b. 1942), Dutch jewelry designer
- Glenys Bakker (b. 1962), Canadian curler
- Hans T. Bakker (b. 1948), Dutch Indologist
- Huib Bakker (b. 1965), Dutch physicist
- Ina Boudier-Bakker (1875–1966), Dutch writer of novels
- Ineke Bakker (b. 1956), Dutch sprint canoeist
- Isabella C. Bakker, Canadian political scientist
- Jan Albert Bakker (b. 1935), Dutch archaeologist
- Jarich Bakker (b. 1974), Dutch track cyclist
- Jason Bakker (b. 1967), Australian cricketer
- Jay Bakker (b. 1975), American pastor, founder of Revolution Church, son of Jim and Tammy Faye
- Jelle Bakker (b. 1985), Dutch YouTuber
- Jim Bakker (b. 1940), American televangelist
- Joop Bakker (1921–2003), Dutch politician
- Justin Bakker (b. 1998), Dutch footballer
- Kees Bakker (zoologist) (1931–2010), Dutch ecologist
- Keith Bakker (1960–2025), American-Dutch mental health practitioner and convicted criminal
- Klaas Bakker (1926–2016), Dutch footballer
- Laurens Bakker (b. 1950s), Dutch heavy metal drummer
- Liliana Bakker (b. 1958), Argentine biologist, researcher and professor
- Marcus Bakker (1923–2009), Dutch communist politician
- Mees Bakker (b. 2001), Dutch footballer
- Mitchel Bakker (b. 2000), Dutch footballer
- Nick Bakker (b. 1992), Dutch footballer
- Nordin Bakker (b. 1997), Dutch footballer
- Patrick Bakker (1910–1932), Dutch painter
- Paul-Jan Bakker (b. 1957), Dutch cricketer
- Peter Bakker (b. 1961), Dutch businessman
- Peter Bakker (rower) (b. 1934), Dutch rower
- Piet Bakker (canoeist) (b. c. 1925), Dutch sprint canoeist
- Piet Bakker (writer) (1897–1960), Dutch journalist and author
- Pieter Bakker Schut (1941–2007), Dutch defense lawyer
- Robert T. Bakker (b. 1945), American paleontologist
- Robert Bakker (rower) (b. 1962), Dutch rower
- Robin Bakker (b. 1959), Australian rower
- R. Scott Bakker (b. 1967), Canadian fantasy author
- Sharona Bakker (b. 1990), Dutch hurdler
- Sonja Bakker (b. 1974), Dutch dietician
- Tammy Faye Bakker (1942–2007), American Christian singer and televangelist
- Tim Bakker (b. 1977), Canadian football player

== De Bakker ==
- Jaco de Bakker (1939–2012), Dutch computer scientist
- Jan de Bakker (1499–1525), Dutch priest executed for heresy
- Joseph De Bakker (1934–2025), Belgian cyclist
- Paul de Bakker (b. 1973), Dutch bioinformatician
- Thiemo de Bakker (b. 1988), Dutch tennis player

== Den Bakker ==
- Maarten den Bakker (b. 1969), Dutch road bicycle racer

== Bakkers ==
- Erik Bakkers (b. 1972), Dutch physicist
