= Districts and neighbourhoods of Appingedam =

The Dutch municipality Appingedam is divided into districts and neighbourhoods for statistical purposes. The municipality is divided into the following statistical districts:

- Wijk 00 (CBS-districtcode:000300)

A statistical district may consist of several neighbourhoods. The table below shows the neighbourhood division with characteristic values according to the Statistics Netherlands (CBS, 2008):

CBS-neighbourhood code	Neighbourhood name	Population	Area total (ha)	Area land (ha)	Position
BU00030000	Appingedam-Centrum	2520	90	84	Location in the municipality
BU00030001	Appingedam-West	3170	163	156	Location in the municipality
BU00030002	Appingedam-Oost	5860	296	285	Location in the municipality
BU00030007	Verspreide huizen Damsterdiep en Eemskanaal	340	558	541	Location in the municipality
BU00030008	Verspreide huizen ten zuiden van Eemskanaal	100	587	562	Location in the municipality
BU00030009	Verspreide huizen ten noorden van Damsterdiep	140	768	754	Location in the municipality
