= Onno Reint Alberda van Ekenstein =

Dutch politician (1752–1821)

Jhr. Onno Reint Alberda van Ekenstein

Member of the Senate
- In office 21 September 1815 – 21 October 1821

Member of the States General
- In office 2 May 1814 – 31 August 1815

Personal details
- Born: Onno Reint Alberda van Ekenstein; 3 February 1752 Groningen, Netherlands
- Died: 21 October 1821 (aged 69) Huize Ekenstein, Tjamsweer
- Spouse: Maria Albertina van Berchuys (m. 1772; died 1819)
- Children: 4
- Occupation: Politician; auditor

Onno Reint Alberda van Ekenstein (Dutch pronunciation: [ɔˈnoː rɛint ɑlˈbɛrdaː vɑn ˈeːkə(n)stɛin]; 3 February 1752 – 21 October 1821) was a Dutch nobleman who served in the States General and the Senate. He bore the title of jonkheer.

== Biography ==
Alberda van Ekenstein was born in 1752 in Groningen. His parents were Onno Joost Alberda van Ekenstein and Anna Maria Hora. He married Maria Albertina van Berchuys (1750–1819) on 5 July 1772 in Groningen. The couple had eight children, four of whom survived early childhood: Onno Joost, Anna Maria Catharina, Tathia Adriana Henderica Ommelandica, and Willem.

A Knight of the Order of the Netherlands Lion, Alberda van Ekenstein served on the Provincial Executive of Groningen and Ommelanden and as a delegate to the audit office of the Dutch Republic. Besides, he was on the board of supervisors of the University of Groningen. When the States General of the Netherlands were restored on 2 May 1814 after the Netherlands had regained its sovereignty from the First French Empire, Alberda van Ekenstein became a member. On 28 August 1814, he was appointed to the Knighthood of Groningen, an electoral college of noblemen, upon its establishment, and he would later serve as its president. The States General were split into the House of Representatives and Senate in September 1815, and Alberda van Ekenstein became a pro-government member of the latter. He died on 21 October 1821 in his family estate in Tjamsweer near Appingedam while still a senator.
