= Bovens =

Bovens is a Dutch surname. Notable people with the surname include:

- Luc Bovens (born 1963), Belgian philosopher
- Mark Bovens (born 1957), Dutch public administration scholar
- Theo Bovens (born 1959), Dutch politician
