= Peter Jan Margry =

Dutch historian and European ethnologist (born 1956)

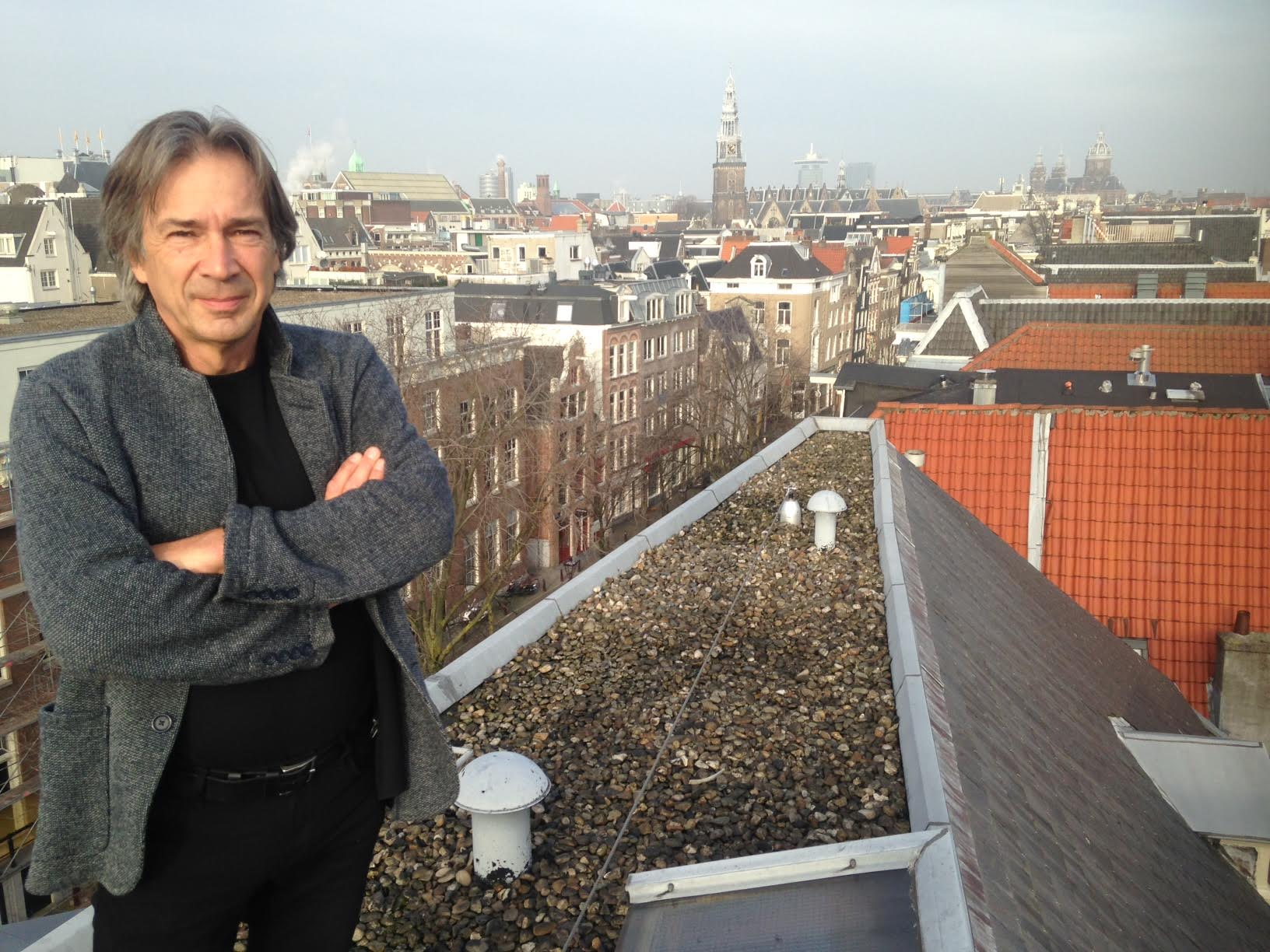
- Margry (2017)
- Born: Petrus Johannes Joseph Margry; April 6, 1956 (age 69); Breda, North Brabant, the Netherlands.
- Education: University of Amsterdam
- Occupation: historian
- Children: Sam Margry; Nomy Margry

Peter Jan Margry (born April 6, 1956) is a Dutch historian and European ethnologist who was till November 2022 professor European Ethnology at the University of Amsterdam and, from 1993 to 2022, senior fellow at the Royal Netherlands Academy of Arts and Sciences research center Meertens Institute in the Netherlands. Previously, he worked in The Hague and Den Bosch where he held positions as archivist-researcher, historian and archival inspector successively at the Dutch National Archives, the Court of Audit (Netherlands) and the province of North Brabant. During the 1990s he was also active as a consultant on document heritage, working in Suriname and Papua (Indonesia).

== Biographical information ==
Peter Jan Margry received an MA in medieval history from the University of Amsterdam in 1983. In 1985 he finished the post-doctoral study of Archivistics in The Hague. He received his PhD in cultural history from the University of Tilburg in 2000. From 2004 to 2015 he was executive vice-president/secretary of SIEF, the International Society for Ethnology and Folklore, during which time he was instrumental in the regeneration of this professional organization of now mainly European and North-American ethnologists/anthropologists and folklorists. From 2010 to 2013 he was also chair of SIEF's Ethnology of Religion Working Group, and continued as a board member. In 2011 he was professor of Religious Studies at the Catholic University of Leuven. He was visiting scholar/professor at the universities of California (Berkeley), Oregon (Eugene), Iceland, and Istanbul (Süleyman Sah).

== Research and work ==
Since 2013, Margry has been professor of European ethnology at the University of Amsterdam, within the department of Cultural Studies. His research program was laid out in his inaugural lecture of 2014. He focuses on past and contemporary religious cultures and new ("deviant") religious movements, rituality, pilgrimage, memorialization, cultural memory, and (Intangible) cultural heritage and everyday life in general. The output of his research is listed online. During his history study he also pioneered in pilgrimage photography in the Netherlands in 1980–1981, of which a selection was chosen as part of the national online heritage collection "Memory of the Netherlands." Later, between 1993 and 1999, he executed a long-term research project on Dutch pilgrimage culture, which resulted in a four volume book series and the BoL online research database. The 'logic' for that pilgrimage endeavor was recorded in a 2017 clip. In 2000-2001 he lived in Italy, researching the Holy Year and doing fieldwork on so called "deviant devotions."

After the killing of the Dutch politician Pim Fortuyn in 2002 he acquired the letters and mementos posted at the various spontaneous or grassroots memorials in the Netherlands for the Meertens Institute and started to publish on them as well as on ritual practices related to mourning and protest after traumatic death.

As a follow-up to the pilgrimage project he initiated RAHRP, the Religious and Alternative Healing Research Platform in order to structure cultural and ethnological research on these 'alternative' practices. His current research involves also the politics of UNESCO's intangible cultural heritage convention (2003), in particular in relation to Dutch practices that caught international attention, as was the case for the Saint Nicholas tradition with his 'blackface' helper 'Zwarte Piet'.

Due to his research on pilgrimage culture, he played an important role in the discovery of the scholarly misconduct and fraud of the endowed professor of political anthropology at the Vrije Universiteit Amsterdam Mart Bax.

== Books ==
- Visionaire woorden en werelden: verbeelding in de Etnologie (Amsterdam: valedictory lecture University of Amsterdam, 2022)
- Material Change. The Impact of Reform and Modernity on Material Religion in North-West Europe, 1780-1920 (Leuven: Leuven University Press, 2021; co-editor Jan De Maeyer)
- Vurige Liefde. Het geheim rond het Bloedig Bruidje van Welberg (Amsterdam: Prometheus, 2021)
- Cold War Mary: Ideologies, Politics and Marian Devotional Culture (Leuven: Leuven University Press/KADOC, 2020)
- The Miracle of Amsterdam: Biography of a Contested Devotion (Notre Dame: Notre Dame UP, 2019) (co-author Charles Caspers)
- Healing en 'alternatief genezen'. Een culturele diagnose (Amsterdam: Amsterdam University Press, 2018)
- Spiritualizing the City: Agency and Resilience of the Urban and Urbanesque Habitat (Milton Park: Routledge, 2017) (co-editor Victoria Hegner)
- Experiencing Religion. New Approaches to Personal Religiosity (Berlin: Lit-Verlag, 2016) (co-editor Clara Saraiva et al.)
- What's in a Discipline? Special issue on the occasion of the 50th anniversary of the International Society for Ethnology and Folklore, Cultural Analysis 13 (2014) 1-115 (co-editor Valdimar Hafstein)
- Bloed Kruipt! Over de Culturele Hemoglobine van de Samenleving (Amsterdam: AUP, 2014; inaugural lecture University of Amsterdam)
- Grassroots Memorials. The Politics of Memorializing Traumatic Death (New York: Berghahn, 2011) (co-editor: Cristina Sánchez-Carretero)
- Shrines and Pilgrimage in the Modern World. New Itineraries into the Sacred (Amsterdam: Amsterdam University Press, 2008)
- Reframing Dutch Culture. Between Otherness and Authenticity (Aldershot: Ashgate, 2007)(co-editor: H. Roodenburg)
- P.J. Meertens van het Meertens Instituut (Amsterdam: MI, 2002)
- Teedere quaesties. Religieuze rituelen in conflict: confrontaties tussen katholieken en protestanten rond de processiecultuur in 19e-eeuws Nederland (Hilversum: Verloren, 2000) (dissertation)
- Bedevaartplaatsen in Nederland, 4 volumes (Amsterdam/Hilversum: Meertens Instituut/Verloren, 1997–2004) (co-author and editor: Charles Caspers)
- Zes eeuwen rekenkamer. Van Camere van der rekeninghen tot Algemene Rekenkamer (Den Haag 1989) (co-editors E.C. van Heukelom en A.J.R.M. Linders)
- Amsterdam en het mirakel van het heilig sacrament. Van middeleeuwse devotie tot 20e-eeuwse stille omgang (Amsterdam: Polis, 1988)
- Stadsplattegronden: Werken met kaartmateriaal bij stadshistorisch onderzoek (Hilversum: Verloren, 1987) (co-authors P. Ratsma and B. Speet)
- Bedevaartplaatsen in Noord-Brabant (Eindhoven: Bura, 1982)
