= Mart Bax =

Dutch anthropologist

Marten Meile Gerrit "Mart" Bax (born 13 April 1937, Zutphen) is a Dutch emeritus (retired in 2002) endowed professor in political anthropology at the Vrije Universiteit (VU University), Amsterdam, the Netherlands.

After his retirement, he came into prominence to the wider public in the Netherlands in 2012 due to suspicions of scientific misconduct. In September 2013, these suspicions were confirmed in an official report.

== Biography ==
Bax wrote his dissertation (cum laude) for the University of Amsterdam in 1973 about the anonymized Irish town "Patricksville".

He further wrote about an anonymized pilgrimage center, called "Neerdonk" in the Dutch province of North Brabant.

He also wrote extensively about the pilgrimage center Medjugorje in the former Yugoslavia.

== Scientific misconduct ==
Bax's portrayal of the fictional town of "Patricksville" as having extensive corruption, bribery, and clientelism was later found to contain invented facts and fabricated or unreliable fieldwork data.

In his publications, Bax claimed that approximately 140 people had been killed, 60 were missing, and approximately 600 had fled Medjugorje during the conflict. Bax wrote that he had based his observations on extensive local field research. He called this alleged conflict the "little war" ("mali rat"). According to Bax, the alleged killings in 1991–1992 were the result of a vendetta between clans rather than ethnic conflict. Apart from very local writings near Medjugorje, Bax's claims were first publicly challenged in journalistic investigations in 2008. By April 2013, there was strong evidence that Bax's claims about the mass killings, missing persons, and refugees were unfounded.

In October 2012 the Dutch book Ontspoorde Wetenschap (Engl.: Derailed Science) by the science journalist Frank van Kolfschooten was published. In the book Van Kolfschooten pointed to the lack of confirmation of the vendetta. Bax had published anonymized results about field research that he stated to have done in a monastery in the province of North Brabant in the Netherlands. Van Kolfschooten had doubts about the existence of the monastery, because the existence of the monastery could not be confirmed by experts and because Bax refused to tell anyone in confidence the name and the location of the monastery. The writings by Van Kolfschooten were largely based on the unpublished work of Dr. Peter Jan Margry of the Meertens institute. The Free University, Amsterdam, reacted by announcing an investigation of Bax's works.

The Dutch Volkskrant newspaper wrote in April 2013 that Bax's scientific writings about the Bosnian pilgrimage site Medjugorje contained many important incorrect citations to local writings or to non-existent local writings. Bax also incorrectly stated that the resident register was destroyed during the Bosnian war.

The Volkskrant also wrote in the same lengthy article that approximately one third of the scientific publications that Bax had submitted to the university's internal database, called Metis, did not exist. The Volkskrant accused him of fraud.

A commission to investigate this possible scientific misconduct was chaired by Michiel Baud. It published its findings in a report dated September 9, 2013, which was made public on September 23, 2013. The commission confirmed serious misconduct:

- In the Neerdonk as well as Medjugorje case, Bax stated to have relied on one single local informant. The informant told him improbable stories about public events that were not confirmed by anyone else. Bax furthermore did not make any effort to check these stories. Bax wrote down the stories of the two alleged informants with certainty and in detail as if these were historical facts. The commission considered this methodology scientifically irresponsible and a case of serious scientific misconduct. The commission considered these stories likely to be invented either by Bax or the informants. The commission was unable to interview these two informants, because one had died and the other could not be found. Consequently the most serious scientific misconduct accusation, i.e. data fabrication by Bax, could not be proved.
- Of the 161 publications claimed by Bax, 64 are non-existent. He signed off his yearly publication list, so this makes it a crime of written misrepresentation. This is fraud against his employer.
- The case on the pilgrimage site "Neerdonk", subject of his published inaugural speech, was considered to be invented.
- The book Medjugorje: Religion, Politics, and Violence in Rural Bosnia (1995) mentions a blood feud for which there is no evidence at all. None of the inhabitants of the area are aware of anything like this happening.
- Shortly after the publication of the book mentioned above, Bax stated that he misinterpreted some information, but claimed he did not have the chance to make any rectifications.
- The commission established he did have the opportunity to rectify these errors at various occasions, yet never did.
- After the publication of Medjugorje: Religion, Politics, and Violence in Rural Bosnia, Bax referred to the blood feud in three other articles, after he already stated to be aware of the misinterpretation, which the commission labeled as "serious scientific misconduct".

The VU announced that it will warn academic publishers against Bax. The VU stated that it will not take legal steps against Bax because he is old and because the crime of written misrepresentation has passed the statute of limitations.

== Reactions by Bax ==
In Margry's own words, he could not, starting from the mid-1990s, make sense of Bax's works regarding the Neerdonk case, or in particular of Bax's inaugural speech of 1989. Margry contacted Bax and received replies from Bax that did not remove his doubts.

In 2008, the Frankfurter Rundschau did not receive a reply from Bax about the fact that he could not have observed in Medjugorje what he claimed to have observed. In 2012, Van Kolfschooten did not receive a reply to the letters that he sent to Bax.

In April 2013, Bax wrote to the Volkskrant the following.

- The supposed vendetta between clans in Medjugorje, which Bax referred to as the "little war", was based on a mistake which close colleagues had warned him about in 1995, in which he confused Yugoslavia during World War II (1941–1945) with the Bosnian war (1991–1995). He stated that he had tried in vain to correct his mistake with a rectification in a second edition. The second edition never appeared however. Bax did not explain why he kept on publicizing the "little war" years after the end of the Bosnian war in 1995.
- Bax had written that the resident register had been destroyed during the Bosnian war, which is untrue. Bax explained this by stating that a key informant had told him that he did not need to do any effort to check the killings in the "little war". Bax admitted that in hindsight, he should have done more.
- Bax referred in his writings to a newspaper Mostarski List, which never existed. According to Bax, this was not a newspaper but a secret pamphlet.
- Regarding the missing inhabitants due to the "little war", Bax stated that he had seen vacated homes.

In 2013, the Baud committee spoke three times with Bax. In addition to the explanations to the Volkskrant, Bax said that he had written down improbable alleged historical events with certainty to make his articles accessible to readers. He stated that he had followed in this respect the example of Norbert Elias. Bax did not reply when the report of the Baud committee was released in September 2013.

== Bax's selected 'scientific' publications ==
- Harpstrings and confessions: an anthropological study of politics in rural Ireland, 1973, dissertation
- Figurational Analysis: A Better Perspective for Networkers. With an Illustration from Ireland. In: Anthropological Quarterly. Band 51, Nr. 4, 1978.
- Religieuze regimes en staatsontwikkeling. Notities voor een figuratie-benadering. In: Amsterdams Sociologisch Tijdschrift. Band 12, Nr. 1, 1985, S. 22–48.
- De vernedering van een heilige. Religieuze machtspolitiek in een zuidnederlandse dorpsgemeenschap, Hilversum, 1989, inaugural speech
- Medjugorjes kleine oorlog. Barbarisering in een Bosnische bedevaartplaats. In: Amsterdams Sociologisch Tijdschrift. Band 20, Nr. 1, Amsterdam 1993, S. 3–25.
- Medjugorje: Religion, Politics, and Violence in Rural Bosnia. Vrij Universiteit Uitgeverij, Amsterdam 1995. (Anthropological studies VU; v. 16) ISBN 978-90-5383-384-1.
- Civilization and decivilization in Bosnia. In: Ethnologia Europaea. Band 27:2, 1997.
- Holy Mary and Medjugorje's Rocketeers. In: Ethnologia Europaea. Band 30:1, 2000.
- Warlords, Priests and the Politics of Ethnic Cleansing: a Case-Study from Rural Bosnia Hercegovina. In: Ethnic and Racial Studies. Band 23 No. 1, January 2000, S. 16–36. (PDF-Datei; 194 kB)

== Bibliography by others about Bax ==
- Kolfschooten, Frank van, October 2012, Ontspoorde Wetenschap (Engl.: "Derailed science"), De Kring publishing house, Dutch language monograph about various cases of (largely recent) scientific misconduct, ISBN 9789491567025
- Jolić, Robert, 2013, Fabrications on Medjugorje: on Mart Bax’ Research. Studia ethnologia Croatica 25: 309-355.
- Margry, Peter Jan. 2019. On Scholarly Misconduct and Fraud and What to Learn From It. In: Ethnologia Europaea 49(2): 133-144.
- Radoš, Ivica Fikcija, a ne povijest article in Croatian in the Zagreb-based Jutarnji list newspaper, published on 10 August 2008
- Žanič, Ivo: War and Peace in Hercegovina. Review of "Mart Bax: Medjugorje — Religion, Politics, and Violence in Rural Bosnia. Amsterdam: VU Uitgeverij/Publishing house, 1995", Zagreb 1998

== See also ==
- List of scientific misconduct incidents
