= Koelman =

Koelman is a surname. Notable people with the surname include:

- Rudolf Koelman (born 1959), Dutch violinist
- Jan Philip Koelman (1818–1893), Dutch painter
