= Van Breemen =

van Breemen is a surname. Notable people with the surname include:

- Edo Van Breemen, Canadian musician
- Finn van Breemen (born 2003), Dutch footballer
- Nico van Breemen (born 1942), Dutch soil scientist]

== See also ==
- Henk van den Breemen (born 1941), Dutch military officer
