= Louise Kaiser =

Dutch phonetician and linguist (1891 – 1973)

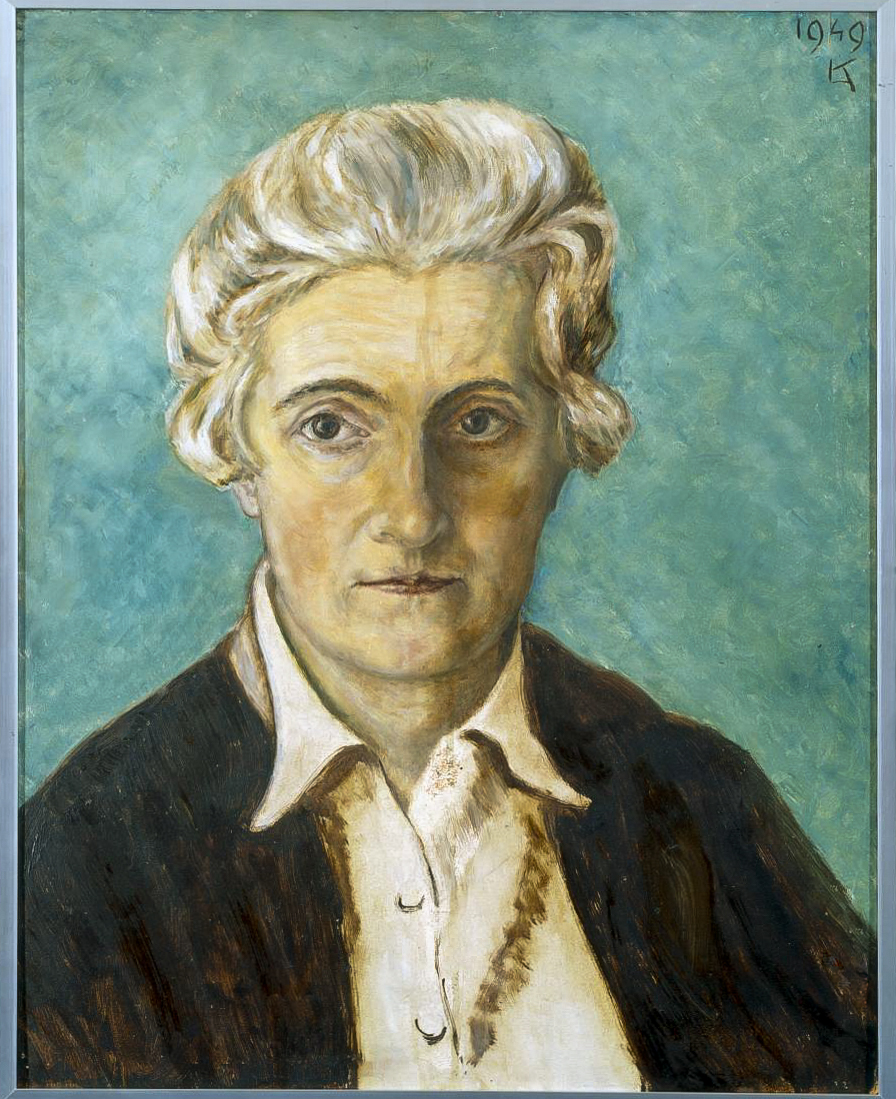
- Self Portrait, 1949
- Born: 15 October 1891; Medemblik, Netherlands
- Died: 2 April 1973 (aged 81); Bussum, Netherlands
- Education: University of Amsterdam
- Occupation: Phonetician
- Known for: Phonetic and physical-anthropological measurements on the Urk people

Louise Kaiser (Medemblik, 15 October 1891 – Bussum, 2 April 1973) was a Dutch phonetician and linguist and the first female lecturer at the University of Amsterdam and became known for her research into the phonetic and physical-anthropological measurements on the people of Urk in the Netherlands.

== Life and work ==
Kaiser was born into a wealthy doctor's family and she spent her childhood in Hoorn. She studied medicine at the University of Amsterdam. She passed her medical exam in 1918 and obtained her doctorate on 14 May 1924 with G.A. van Rijnberk on The segmental innervation of the pigeon's skin.

Kaiser gave her first courses in applied phonetics in the physiological laboratory of the University of Amsterdam as early as 1922. In 1926 a chair was set up for the phonetic sciences and Kaiser was appointed as its first lector, with the assignment to research experimental phonetics. In 1931, she co-founded Dutch association for phonetic sciences. She became the group's president and remained there until 1959.

In 1932, the First International Congress of Phonetic Sciences took place, thanks to Kaiser's involvement. Shortly afterward, in 1933, she founded the Experimental Phonetic Laboratory, the predecessor of the Institute for Phonetic Sciences, now part of the Department of Linguistics at the University of Amsterdam.

Kaiser is considered a pioneer in phonetics. She experimented with sound equipment and was the first in her field to use large numbers of test subjects, as opposed to small groups of selected test subjects. Her research mainly focused on the former Zuiderzee area, including the island of Urk, and the newly drained polders. Here she carried out her most important fieldwork. There has long been scientific interest in the ancient communities in the Zuiderzee area, due to its isolated location and the supposed original population.

In 1928, Kaiser carried out phonetic and physical-anthropological measurements on Urk, which included measuring the height of Urkers' palate, combined with research into hair and eye color. With the establishment of the 'Foundation for Population Research in the drained Zuiderzee Polders' by Kaiser and Amsterdam geographer H.N. ter Veen, research in this area was approached more systematically. From 1936 to 1958 Kaiser was a board member of the section for Linguistics, Phonetics and Folklore. The chairman of the section, Piet Meertens, became the director of the Meertens Institute. Together, Kaiser and the chairman collected sound material from Dutch broadcasters for scientific research.

The audio collection in the field of phonetics with recordings in the field of speech acquisition and dialects, collected by Kaiser and Meertens at the University of Amsterdam, is now housed at the Meertens Institute.

=== Artistry ===
Later in life, Kaiser became an artist, in addition to her work as a lecturer. As the niece of the Dutch artist Johann Wilhelm Kaiser, she had become interested in the visual arts at an early age. She took evening courses at the Quellinus arts and crafts school in Amsterdam. Kaiser retired from the university in 1958.

=== Personal life ===
According to Meertens, "For though anyone who knew her knows she was a strong-willed woman who was not afraid to take on any adversary, she was fundamentally averse to putting herself in the limelight." He speculated that this is the reason she was never named a university professor as she was "entitled."

Kaiser adopted two foster children. She died in 1973.
