= Geert Mak =

Dutch journalist and non-fiction writer (born 1946)

Geert Ludzer Mak
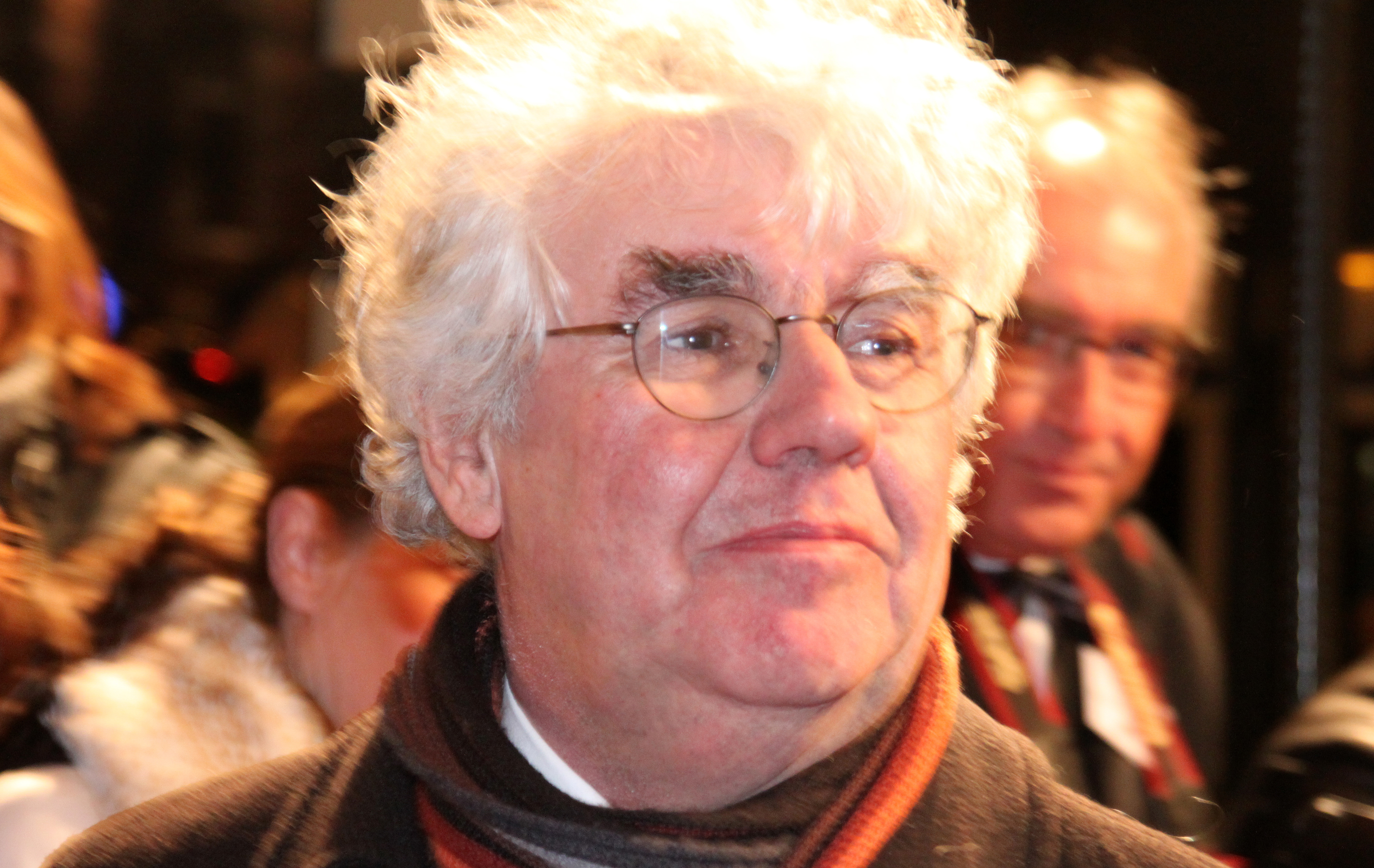
- Born: Geert Mak; 4 December 1946 (age 79); Vlaardingen, Netherlands
- Occupation: Journalist
- Spouse: Mietsie Ruiters
- Children: 2 children
- Writing career
- Notable works: In Europa, "Grote verwachtingen"
- Website: www.geertmak.nl

Geert Ludzer Mak (born 4 December 1946 in Vlaardingen) is a Dutch journalist and non-fiction writer.

== Honors ==
For his book In Europe: Travels through the Twentieth Century, he received the Leipziger Buchpreis zur Europäische Verständigung (2008) and the Otto von der Gablentz Prize (2009). The French government also awarded him the Chevalier de la Légion d'Honneur (2008). In the Netherlands, his exceptional engagement with international history has earned him the Golden Goose's Feather (2015), the Comenius Prize (2016) and the Prince Bernhard Cultural Fund Prize for his entire oeuvre (2017). In the statement that accompanied the honorary degree from Münster, Mak was dubbed a "gifted storyteller" capable of "combining hard science, popularization, originality and engagement." Historians are generally cautious when judging Mak's work.

== Books ==
In 1999, to mark the end of the century, Mak spent an entire year crisscrossing Europe for NRC Handelsblad and published a travel report each day on its front page. It became the account of a journey through the continent as well as the twentieth century, one full of local observations and conversations with eyewitnesses. On that basis he published In Europe (2004), a book for which he received, among other prizes, the NS Reader's Prize for best Dutch book and which was translated into more than fifteen languages. In the public debate Geert Mak has made a name for himself as a staunch defender of multiculturalism.

In Europe was the best-selling book by a Dutch author in the Netherlands in 2004, having sold over 500,000 copies. The British reviews were generally enthusiastic; although, for the professional historian or political scientist, the book has little to offer: "In Europe hardly breaks new ground historically" wrote Martin Woollacott in an otherwise positive review in The Guardian.

Mak himself sees his work as journalism. In an interview with a Dutch journalism trade-journal, he said: "My approach is journalistic. My books are filled with newspaper tricks". Historians are generally cautious when it comes to judging Mak's work. Hermann von der Dunk, emeritus professor of history at Utrecht University, said about Mak: "it is well written, and historically correct, but it is not what I would call academic history. There is no analysis of historical development".

== Television ==
In the autumn of 2007, VPRO released a television adaptation of In Europe, in the form of a series spread across two seasons, 35 episodes in total, presented by Geert Mak. The series prompted some historians to point to a number of errors and comment that the makers were ill-informed about the current debates in the field of history.
