= Jan Philip Koelman =

Dutch painter (1818–1893)

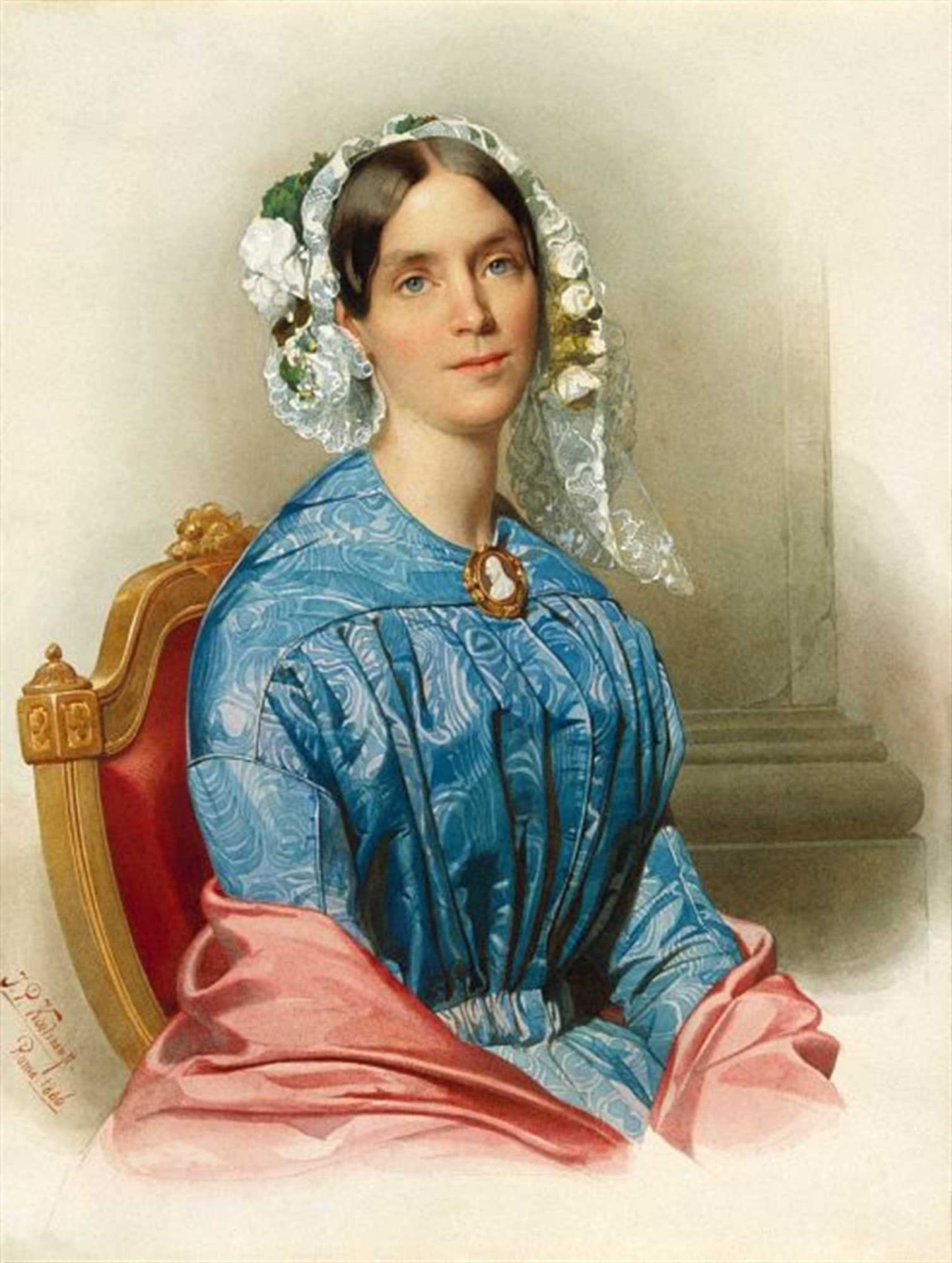
Princess Marianne of the Netherlands, water colours on paper by Jan Philip Koelman, 1846.

Jan (Johan) Philip Koelman (11 March 1818, in The Hague – 10 January 1893, in The Hague) was a Dutch painter, sculptor, writer and teacher, involved during part of his life in revolutionary activity.

He attended Cornelis Kruseman's studio together with other artists of this period, such as Alexander Hugo Bakker Korff, David Bles and Herman ten Kate.

Between 1846 and 1851 Koelman lived in Rome, to where he travelled for artistic purposes, but where he found himself involved in the revolutionary Roman Republic of 1849, and eventually joined Garibaldi's defence of Rome against the French Army.

Koelman's memoirs of that period are used as source material for historians researching Garibaldi's life and the struggle which eventually led to the Unification of Italy, providing some details not recorded elsewhere.

Henry Van Ingen, professor of art at Vassar from 1865 to 1898, was Koelman's brother-in-law.
