= Dick Blok =

Dutch onomastics scholar (1925-2019)

Dirk Peter "Dick" Blok (7 January 1925 – 6 February 2019) was a Dutch scholar of onomastics. He was director of the Meertens Institute between 1965 and 1986. He succeeded founding director Piet Meertens. In 1979, during Blok's rule as director, the Institute was named after Meertens. Blok fictionally featured in the book cycle Het Bureau by J. J. Voskuil, which was based on figures at the Meertens Institute, where Voskuil worked as well.

Blok was born in Oegstgeest. He studied Medieval history at the University of Amsterdam, where he obtained a degree in 1953. In 1960 he earned his doctorate cum laude at the same university under J.F. Niermeyer with a thesis titled Een diplomatisch onderzoek van de oudste particuliere oorkonden van Werden. Blok had a long teaching career at the University of Amsterdam on the topic of settlement history related to the onomastics of place names, first a teaching assignment from 1967 to 1976, and subsequently as extraordinary lector (1976–1980), extraordinary professor (1980–1986) and finally as full professor from 1986 to 1990, when he took up emeritus status. He died on 6 February 2019, aged 94.

Blok was elected a member of the Royal Netherlands Academy of Arts and Sciences in 1984.
