= Klaas Bolt =

Dutch musician (1927–1990)

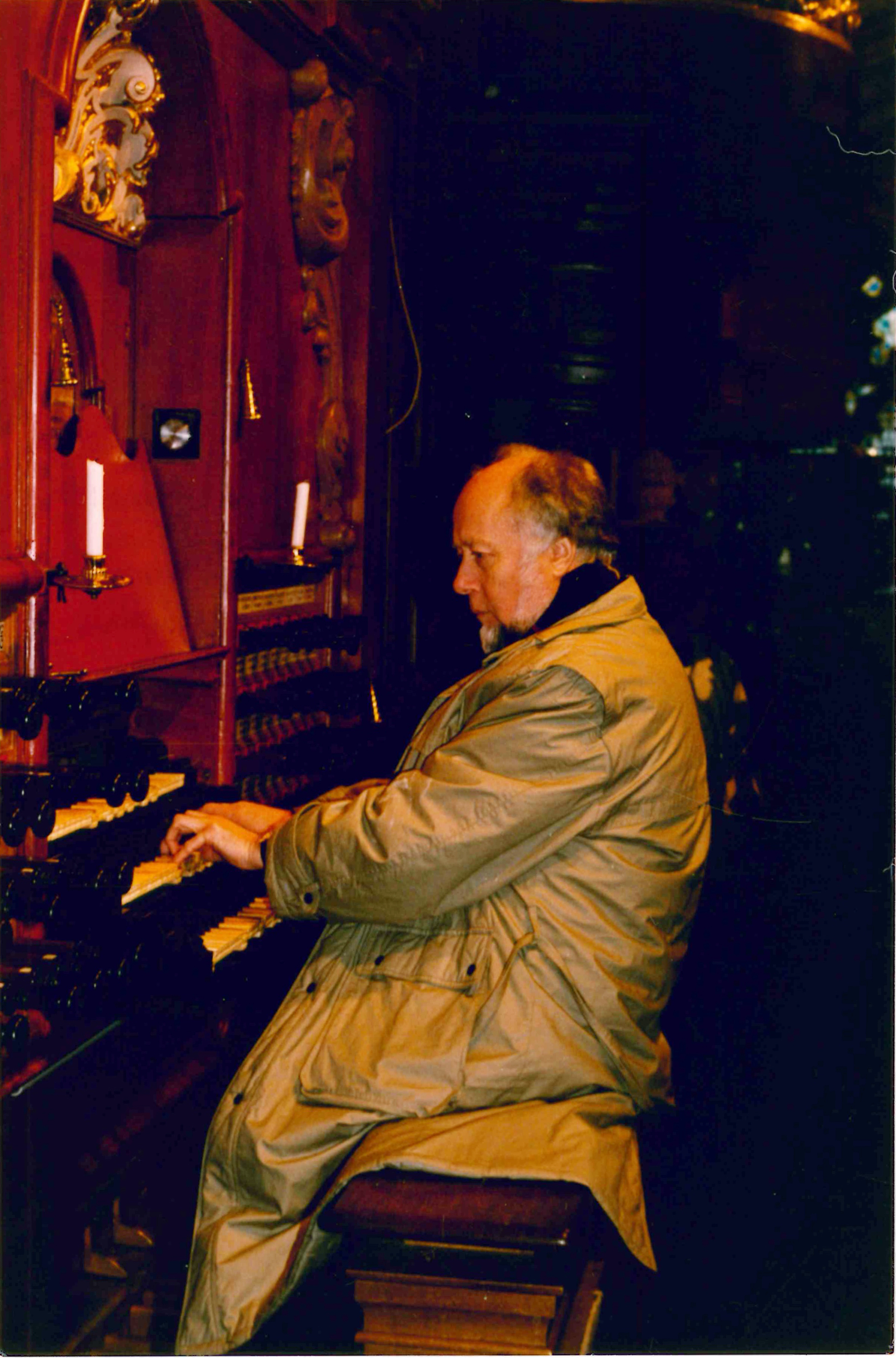
Klaas Bolt in 1990 in Haarlem

Klaas Bolt (6 March 1927 in Appingedam – 11 April 1990 in Haarlem) was a Dutch organist and improviser. He taught improvisation at the Sweelinck Conservatory (named for Jan Pieterszoon Sweelinck, a Dutch organist and composer of the Renaissance) in Amsterdam, where Masaaki Suzuki was among his students. Bolt was a proponent of the use of slow tempi when playing hymns. He played many hymns at his weekly evening hymn sings, which drew substantial audiences. He would typically improvise the hymn introductions at these events.
