= Jan ten Brink =

Dutch writer

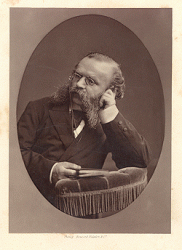
Jan ten Brink

Jan ten Brink (15 June 1834 – 18 July 1901) was a Dutch writer.

He was born in Appingedam, Netherlands. He studied in Leiden, went to Batavia for a few years, and in 1862 he became a teacher at a secondary school in The Hague. In 1884 he became professor in Dutch literature at the Leiden University. Ten Brink was a conservative writer. Conrad Busken Huet and, especially, the 'movement of 80', writers and poets who were far more progressive than Ten Brink, attacked him on several occasions in literary magazines such as De Gids and De Nieuwe Gids. He died, aged 67, in Leiden.

== Works ==
In total, Jan ten Brink wrote over 20 novels, including:

- Gerbrand Adriaensen Brederoó (1859)
- Dirck Volkertsen Coornhert en zijne Wellevenskunst (1860)
- Oost-Indische dames en heeren (1866)
- De schoonzoon van Mevrouw de Roggeveen (1871–1873)
- Eene schitterende carrière (1879)
- De familie Muller Belmonte (1880)

He also wrote several books on the history of Dutch literature:

- Geschiedenis der Noord-Nederlandsche letteren in de XIXe eeuw (1888–1889)
- Geschiedenis der Nederlandsche letterkunde (1897)

Jan ten Brink was known for his admiration of the novels of Émile Zola. He was one of the first Dutch writers to write about naturalism, and the first one to introduce Zola and his novels in the Netherlands, a.o. by writing a book on Émile Zola.

- Émile Zola (1879)
