= Davy Bakker =

Dutch cricketer (born 1972)

Personal information
- Full name: David B. Bakker
- Born: 16 January 1972 (age 54); Rotterdam, Netherlands
- Batting: Right-handed
- Role: Top-order batsman

International information
- National side: Netherlands (1991–1998)
- Source: CricketArchive, 21 January 2016

David B. "Davy" Bakker (born 16 January 1972) is a former Dutch international cricketer who represented the Dutch national side between 1991 and 1998. He played as a right-handed top-order batsman.

Bakker was born in Rotterdam, and played his club cricket for VOC Rotterdam. His father, Ton Bakker, represented the Netherlands at the 1979 ICC Trophy. A former Dutch under-19s player, Bakker made his senior debut for the Netherlands in August 1991, in a one-day match against the West Indies (returning from a tour of England. In 1994, he represented the Netherlands at the ABN-AMRO Trophy, a preparatory tournament for the 1996 World Cup which also included the national teams of Kenya and United Arab Emirates. Bakker made his sole List A appearance in June 1998, when he played a NatWest Trophy game against Somerset. He came in third in the batting order, behind Roger Bradley and Bas Zuiderent, and scored five runs before being dismissed by Steffan Jones. Bakker made his final appearances for the Netherlands at the 1998 European Championship, appearing against Ireland and Denmark.
