= Piet Meertens =

Dutch literary critic (1899–1985)

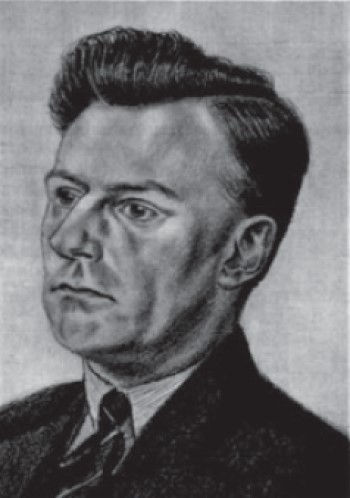
Piet Meertens (1938) (drawing by Henk Henriët)

Pieter Jacobus (Piet) Meertens (Middelburg, 6 September 1899 – Amstelveen, 28 October 1985) was a Dutch scholar of literature, dialects, and ethnology. He founded the institutes which later merged into the Meertens Instituut (a research institute operated by the Royal Netherlands Academy of Arts and Sciences), of which he was the director until 1965.

== Education ==
Meertens attended the Stedelijk Gymnasium Middelburg, and studied Dutch in Utrecht. He was promoted in 1943 with a dissertation on literary life in Zeeland in the 16th and 17th centuries, under the direction of Cornelis de Vooys.

== Career ==
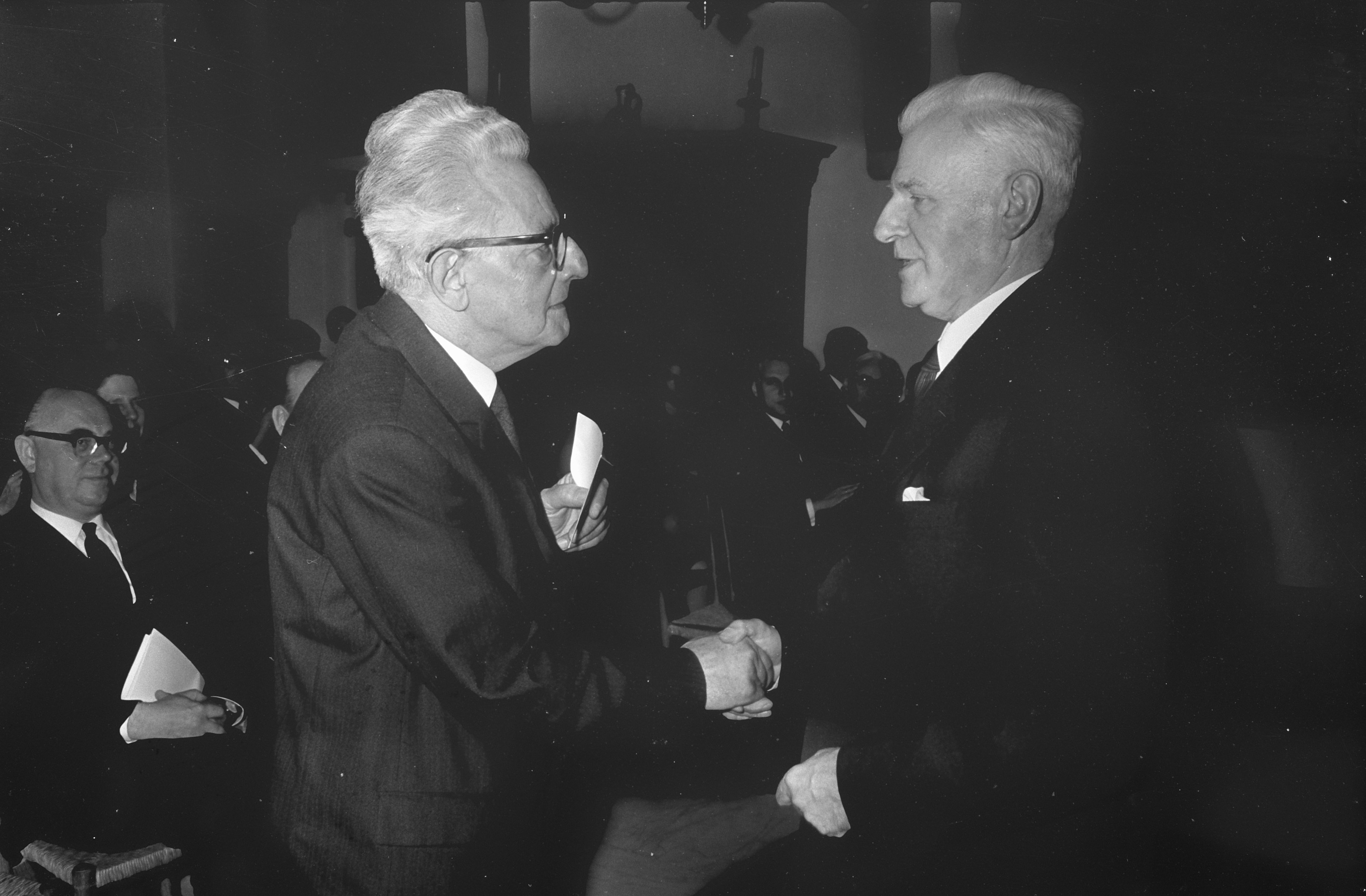
Meertens (right) & C.J.E. Dinaux

After his studies, Meertens taught school for a few years. On 1 July 1930 he became secretary of the committee of dialects for the Royal Netherlands Academy of Arts and Sciences (KNAW); starting with only two assistants he built a system of documentation that employed two thousands correspondents throughout the country who reported on local dialects. In 1934 the KNAW started a committee for ethnology, and Meertens presided over that committee as well, laying the foundation for the institute which was to receive his name in 1979.

He was actively involved with the Phonologische Werkgemeenschap, an organization of phonologists, and when the Centrale Commissie voor Onderzoek naar het Nederlandse Volkseigen was founded in 1948, a state-supported institution that oversaw the entire field of Dutch linguistics and onomastics, Meertens was appointed president of the bureaus for dialectology, onomastics, and ethnography, a function he held until his retirement in 1965. In 1950 he was one of the founders of the Algemene Vereniging voor Taalwetenschap (AVT), the General Organization for Linguistics.

In 1966 he became member of the Royal Netherlands Academy for Arts and Sciences.

== Personality ==
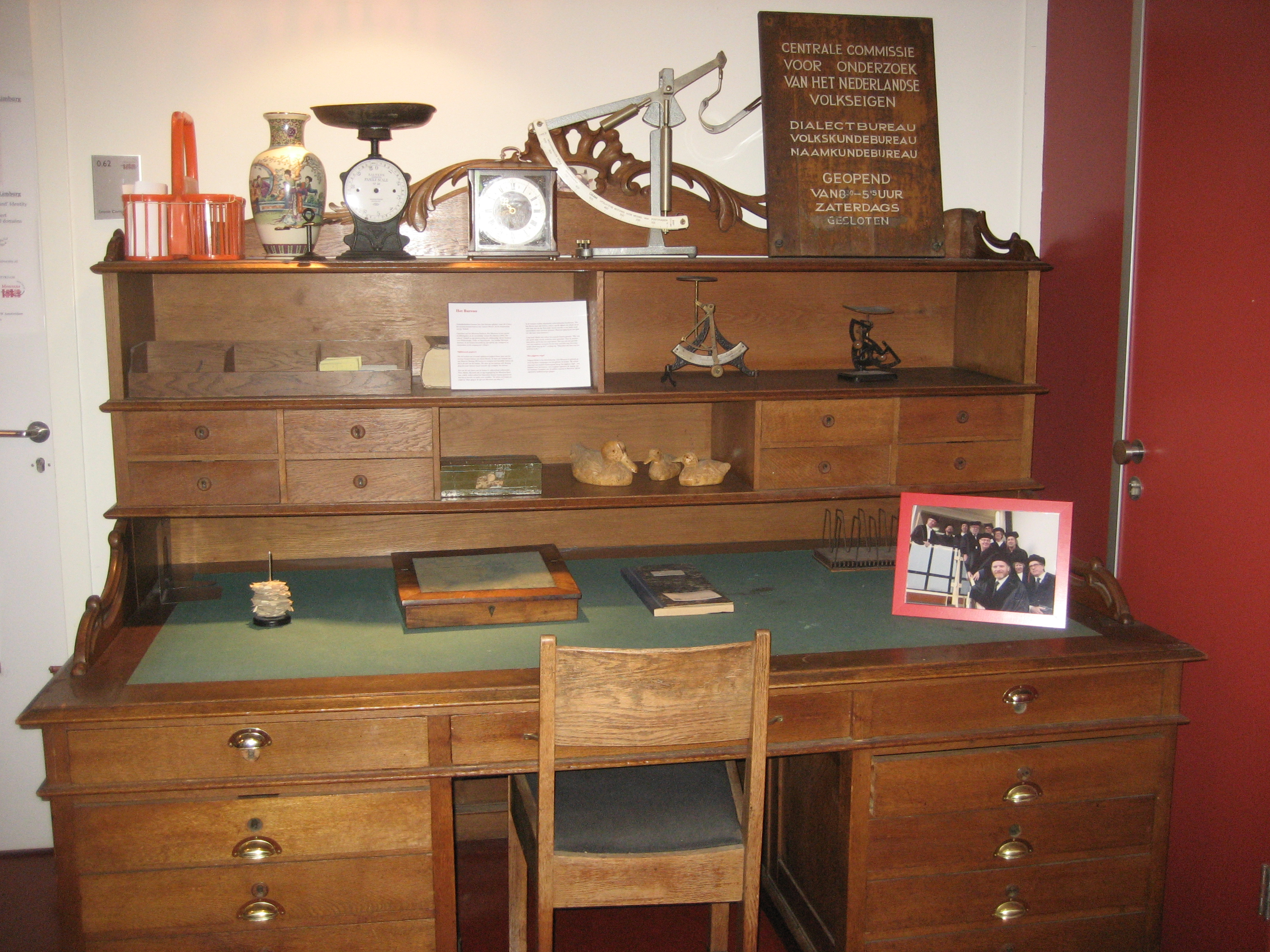
Piet Meertens' desk (2015)

Meertens was a progressive Christian, and a member of the small Christian Democratic Union. In the 1920s, when in Utrecht, he was a member of the board of the Dutch Association of Vegetarians. He was sympathetic to the anti-militaristic strain in the Dutch Reformed Church, and visited prisoners as part of a missionary organization. Christian-Socialist friends of his were journalist Henk van Randwijk, preachers Willem Banning en Jan Buskes, and poet Fedde Schurer. From 1938 on he was active in the Comité van Waakzaamheid, an association of artists and intellectuals inspired by Menno ter Braak which opposed the rise of fascism and Nazism.

But Meertens was also attached to the ideology of the Greater Netherlands, and cared more for cultural than for national boundaries; it united the Dutch and the Flemish with the Germans, though Meertens associated with Nazis unwillingly. The pro-German president of his committees, professor Jan de Vries, who fled to Germany after the war was over, was a close collaborator and persuaded Meertens to engage in pro-German activities; in 1972 Meertens said he did not realize the full scope of those activities. His role during the war began to be investigated in 2005 by a committee led by Hermann von der Dunk, after sociologist Hans Derks had accused Meertens of collaboration with the Germans and the KNAW of sweeping the matter under the rug. The committee's report, published in 2006, concluded that Meertens was not guilty of collaboration, and that the institute could continue carrying his name.

Meertens was actively involved with literature and published extensively. After the war he was the editor of De Vlam, where he became acquainted with Henriette Roland Holst. With the rest of the CDU he joined the PvdA (a social-democratic party) in 1946, and became an ecumenical Christian.

P.J. Meertens is the model for A.P. Beerta in J. J. Voskuil's novel cycle Het Bureau; Voskuil worked with Meertens, and the titular Bureau ("office") is the Meertens institute.

== Bibliography ==
- Jan Noordegraaf, 'Bloemen voor P.J. Meertens'. Mededelingen van het Frederik van Eeden-genootschap 51 (February 2007), 95
- Saskia Daalder, Ad Foolen & Jan Noordegraaf, Taalwetenschap in Nederland. Zestig jaar AVT (1950-2010). Amsterdam: Stichting Neerlandistiek VU & Münster: Nodus Publikationen, 2010. (Uitgaven Stichting Neerlandistiek VU, 65). ISBN 978-90-8880-018-4 / ISBN 978-3-89323-765-4.
