= Leendert Bosch =

Dutch biochemist

Leendert Bosch (13 November 1924 – 20 January 2017) was a Dutch biochemist. He was a professor of biochemistry at Leiden University from 1964 to 1990.

Bosch was born on 13 November 1924 in Appingedam. He obtained his title of Doctor at Delft University of Technology in 1955, with a dissertation titled "Biochemische en endocrinologische onderzoekingen van normaal en neoplastisch weefsel : de stofwisseling van oestrogeen producerende ovariumtumoren" (Biochemical and endocrinological research of normal and neoplastic tissue: the metabolism of oestrogen producing ovarian tumors). In 1961 Bosch was named lector of biochemistry in extraordinary service at Leiden University. In 1963 he became a regular lector, and in 1964 he was named professor.

Bosch was elected a member of the Royal Netherlands Academy of Arts and Sciences in 1978. He was elected a member of the European Molecular Biology Organization in 1982. He retired as professor in 1990.

A member of the Christian Democratic Appeal, Bosch criticized the party for its 2002 election program on biochemical and ethical reasons.

Bosch died on 20 January 2017.
