= Donald Bakker =

Canadian from Penticton

- Born: Donald Michel Bakker
- Known for: First person to be tried in Canada for child prostitution crimes committed in another country
- Status: Released in 2012
- Convictions: 10 counts of sexual assault
- Penalty: 10 years in prison

Donald Michel Bakker is a Canadian from Penticton who made headlines when he was the first person to be tried in Canada for child prostitution crimes committed in another country. Bakker was charged under the sex tourism law which is used to punish those who use child prostitutes while outside Canada.

In 2004, he pleaded not guilty, claiming that Canada has no right to police people while they are outside its jurisdiction. Much of the evidence against him was videotapes that Bakker himself made. Some of these videos show Bakker torturing Vancouver area prostitutes with metal clips and electric cords. Other videos show him having sex with girls in Cambodia, the oldest of whom was 12.

On June 1, 2005, he pleaded guilty to 10 counts of sexual assault to avoid a trial. The Solicitor and Crown prosecutor jointly asked for a 10-year prison sentence. Bakker had already served 18 months, which would count as double time, meaning he will have seven more years in prison. He is eligible for parole within one and a half years.

On June 1, 2012, Donald Bakker was released from prison, and now resides in Abbotsford, British Columbia.
