= Ferry Breedveld =

Dutch university teacher

Ferdinand Christoffel "Ferry" Breedveld (born 18 April 1950) is a Dutch rheumatologist. He was a professor of internal medicine, specializing in rheumatology, at Leiden University from 1991 to 2015. He served as chair of the board of directors of the Leiden University Medical Center from 2006 to 2015.

== Career ==
Breedveld was born on 18 April 1950 in The Hague. He obtained his PhD at Leiden University in 1985, with a dissertation titled: "Felty syndrome". Breedveld was a professor of internal medicine, specializing in rheumatology, at Leiden University from 1991 to 2015.

Breedveld served as chair of the board of directors of the Leiden University Medical Center from 2006 to 2015. In 2009, the hospital, under Breedveld's guidance announced a reduction of staff by 660 persons for the next three years. Between 2007 and 2009 he was President of the European League Against Rheumatism. In September 2015 he became chair of the supervisory board of the Nij Smellinghe hospital.

Breedveld was elected a member of the Royal Netherlands Academy of Arts and Sciences in 2003. In November 2015, after his departure from Leiden University Medical Center, he was appointed a Knight in the Order of the Netherlands Lion for his scientific contributions. The same week the American College of Rheumatology named him Master of their college.
