= Anneke B. Mulder-Bakker =

Historian specialising in women during the Middle Ages

Antje Beitske "Anneke" Mulder-Bakker (born 7 April 1940) is a historian at the University of Groningen who is a specialist in the position of women during the Middle Ages. She writes mainly in Dutch.

== Selected English language publications ==
- The Invention of Saintliness, Routledge, 2002. ISBN 0415267595
- Seeing and Knowing: Women and Learning in Medieval Europe, 1200-1550, Brepols, 2004. (Medieval Women: Texts and Contexts) ISBN 2503514480
- Lives of the Anchoresses: The Rise of the Urban Recluse in Medieval Europe, (Myra Heerspink Scholz, translator), University of Pennsylvania Press, Philadelphia, 2005. ISBN 978-0-8122-3852-5
- (Mulder-Bakker and Wogan-Browne, eds) Household, Women, and Christianities in Late Antiquity and the Middle Ages (Brepols, 2006)
- (ed.) Mary of Oignies. Mother of Salvation (Brepols, 2007)
- Women and Experience in Later Medieval Writing: Reading the Book of Life, Palgrave Macmillan, 2009. ISBN 9780230602878
- (ed.) Living Saints of the Thirteenth Century. The Lives of Yvette, Anchoress of Huy; Juliana of Cornillon, Author of the Corpus Christi Feast; and Margaret the Lame, Anchoress of Magdeburg (Brepols, 2012)
- The Dedicated Spiritual Life of Upper Rhine Noble Women. A Study and Translation of a Fourteenth-Century Spiritual Biography of Gertrude Rickeldey of Ortenberg and Heilke of Staufenberg (Brepols, 2017)
