= Willem Baarda =

Dutch geodesist and professor at Delft University of Technology (1917–2005)

- Born: 20 July 1917; Leeuwarden, the Netherlands
- Died: 2 January 2005; Delft, the Netherlands
- Education: Delft University of Technology
- Known for: Delft School of Geodesy, Reliability theory, S-transformations, Data snooping
- Awards: Knight of the Order of the Netherlands Lion; Officer of the Order of Orange-Nassau; Levallois Medal (IAG)
- Scientific career
- Fields: Geodesy
- Workplaces: Delft University of Technology

Willem Baarda (20 July 1917 – 2 January 2005) was a Dutch geodesist and professor at Delft University of Technology. He is internationally recognized as one of the most influential geodesists of the twentieth century, known as the founder of the Delft School of Geodesy and for developing the modern theory of precision and reliability in geodetic networks.

== Early life and education ==
Baarda was born on 20 July 1917 in Leeuwarden, the Netherlands. After obtaining his HBS-B diploma, he enrolled in 1935 at the newly established programme for Civiel Landmeter (civil surveyor) at the Technische Hogeschool Delft (now Delft University of Technology). He graduated cum laude in 1939.

Following his demobilisation in 1940, he worked as a surveyor for the Dutch Cadastre until 1946, taking part in the measurement of the newly reclaimed Noordoostpolder. Later that year he was transferred to the Rijksdriehoeksmeting in Delft, located in the same building as the Delft surveying school. On the recommendation of Jacob Menno Tienstra, he was appointed lecturer in 1947 in land surveying, levelling and geodesy. After completing his thesis Verkenning van een Snelliuspunt in 1950, he received the diploma of geodetic engineer. Following Tienstra’s death in 1951, Baarda succeeded him as professor of geodesy.

== Academic career ==
In 1958, Baarda founded the Laboratorium voor Geodetische Rekentechniek (LGR) – the Laboratory for Geodetic Computing – which played a pivotal role in modernising computational methods in geodesy. Under his leadership, the LGR became the core of the newly independent Department of Geodesy at Delft.

His early scientific work included the report Some Remarks on the Computation and Adjustment of Large Systems of Geodetic Triangulations (1954), presented at the IAG Congress in Rome. In it, he critically examined the classical theory of geodetic adjustment and argued against the complexity of ellipsoidal computation models.

During the 1950s and 1960s, Baarda developed a comprehensive theory of point determination, distinguishing between estimable and non-estimable quantities, between shape and datum parameters, and between free and constrained networks. These ideas culminated in his celebrated S-transformation theory, providing a mathematically elegant way to handle non-invertible systems. His work on the Handleiding voor de Technische Werkzaamheden van het Kadaster (HTW ’56) already reflected these emerging ideas and earned him appointment as Officier in de Orde van Oranje-Nassau.

== Scientific contributions ==
Baarda’s theoretical innovations transformed geodetic adjustment and network design. His principal contributions include:

- the S-system and S-transformations, separating internal precision from external reliability;
- the B-method of testing and the concept of data snooping, introducing systematic detection of gross errors in observation data;
- the definition of the marginally detectable bias, providing a probabilistic measure of error detectability;
- his 1968 publication A Testing Procedure for Use in Geodetic Networks.

Baarda extended his theoretical framework to three-dimensional and gravimetric networks, bridging geometric and physical geodesy. His 1979 report A Connection between Geometric and Gravimetric Geodesy exemplified this integration.

== Leadership and influence ==
Baarda was a member of the Netherlands Geodetic Commission (NCG) from 1952 to 1996, serving as secretary (1957–1980) and chairman (1980–1987), and was later made an honorary member. Internationally, he chaired the IAG Special Study Group “Specifications for Fundamental Geodetic Networks” from 1963 to 1979, influencing international geodetic standards.

His Delft laboratory became a centre of innovation, fostering generations of Dutch and international geodesists. Among his students was Peter Teunissen, later a leading figure in mathematical geodesy.

== Honours and recognition ==
Baarda received numerous honours, including:

- Knight of the Order of the Netherlands Lion
- Officer of the Order of Orange-Nassau
- Member of the Royal Netherlands Academy of Arts and Sciences (1971)
- Honorary Doctor of the University of Stuttgart
- Recipient of the Levallois Medal of the International Association of Geodesy

In 2004, during the symposium De aarde op maat marking 125 years of the Netherlands Geodetic Commission, the biennial Prof. Baarda Lecture was established, and a bronze bust of Baarda was unveiled in his honour.

== Later years and death ==
Even after his retirement in 1982, Baarda continued to contribute to the field. Until late 2004, he was active in discussions on the revision of the Rijksdriehoeksmeting and the Normaal Amsterdams Peil, critically examining the use of the geoid and the accuracy of GPS-derived heights.

He died on 2 January 2005 in Delft, aged 87.

== Selected works ==
- Some Remarks on the Computation and Adjustment of Large Systems of Geodetic Triangulations (1954)
- Statistical Concepts in Geodesy (1967)
- A Testing Procedure for Use in Geodetic Networks (1968)
- Modeleffecten in de Geodesie (1963)
- A Connection between Geometric and Gravimetric Geodesy (1979)

== Legacy ==
Baarda’s theories underpin modern adjustment computation, error propagation, and network optimization. Concepts such as data snooping, S-systems, criterion matrices, and marginally detectable bias remain standard terminology in geodesy and surveying software. His influence, collectively known as the Delft School of Geodesy, continues to shape spatial measurement science worldwide.

== See also ==
- Peter Teunissen - successor at Delft
- International Association of Geodesy
- Geodesy
- Normaal Amsterdams Peil
