= Jaco de Bakker =

Dutch computer scientist (1939–2012)

- Born: Jacobus Willem de Bakker; 7 March 1939; Ede, Netherlands
- Died: 13 December 2012 (aged 73); Amsterdam
- Occupation: Full professor

Academic background
- Education: Vrije Universiteit Amsterdam
- Doctoral advisor: Aad van Wijngaarden

Academic work
- Discipline: Computer science

Jacobus Willem (Jaco) de Bakker (7 March 1939 – 13 December 2012) was a Dutch theoretical computer scientist and professor at the Vrije Universiteit Amsterdam.

== Biography ==
De Bakker studied mathematics at the Vrije Universiteit and the Universiteit van Amsterdam. At the last he obtained his doctorate in 1967 under Aad van Wijngaarden for the thesis: Formal Description of Programming Languages: with an application to the definition of ALGOL 60. Since 1964 he was already working as a scientist at the time named Mathematisch Centrum (MC) in Amsterdam (from 1984 the Centrum Wiskunde & Informatica). He was later head of the computer science department, lead the Cluster Software Engineering and was since 2002 a CWI Fellow. In 1973 he also became professor of computer science at the Vrije Universiteit, where he became emeritus in 2002.

== Work ==
As computer scientist De Bakker was interested in the mathematical semantics of programming languages (as subject in which he was a pioneer) and their proof theory (program verification). He was in 1972 one of the founders of the European Association for Theoretical Computer Science (EATCS), where he was from 1972 to 1982 vice-chair and from 1988 member of the steering committee.

In 1989 he was awarded membership of the Royal Netherlands Academy of Arts and Sciences (KNAW). The next year he became member of the Academia Europaea. In 2002 he was named a knight of the Orde van de Nederlandse Leeuw. De Bakker died at the age of 73.
