= Ton Bisseling =

Dutch molecular biologist

Ton Bisseling (born 1952) is a Dutch molecular biologist. He is a professor at Wageningen University and Research Centre.

In 1975 Bisseling obtained a degree in biology from the Radboud University Nijmegen. Five years later he earned his PhD in molecular biology at Wageningen University. In 1998 Bisseling became professor and head of the molecular biology laboratory at the same institution. During his career Bisseling has done research on the symbiosis between root nodules and rhizobia bacteria.

Bisseling became a member of the European Molecular Biology Organization in 1996. He was elected a member of the Royal Netherlands Academy of Arts and Sciences in 2010. Ton Bisseling was elected as a Foreign member of the Chinese Academy of Engineering, in November 2021.
