= Antal van den Bosch =

Dutch language researcher

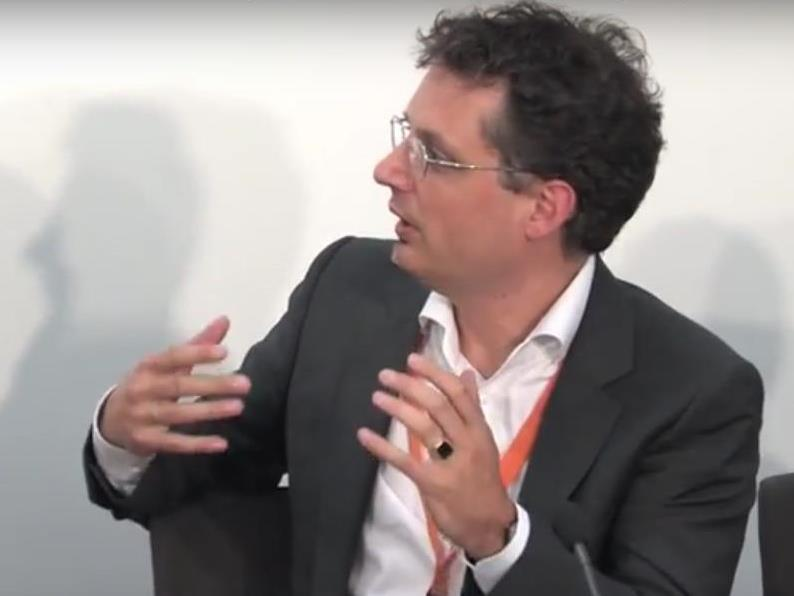
Van den Bosch (2014)

Antal P.J. van den Bosch (born 5 May 1969) is a Dutch-language researcher. He has been director of the Meertens Institute since January 2017. He previously was a professor at Tilburg University and Radboud University Nijmegen.

== Career ==
Van den Bosch was born in Made on 5 May 1969. He studied language and literature, with a focus on linguistics and computer science, at Tilburg University. Van den Bosch obtained his master's degree in 1992. In 1997 he obtained his title of doctor cum laude at Maastricht University with a dissertation titled: Learning to pronounce written words. A study in inductive language learning. Van den Bosch then returned to Tilburg University, where from 1997 to 2001 he was a postdoc. Between 2001 and 2008 he was university lecturer. In 2008 he was named professor of memory, language and meaning.

Van den Bosch moved to the Radboud University Nijmegen in 2011, where he became professor of Example-based language modelling. He became director of the Meertens Institute on 1 January 2017, succeeding Hans Bennis.

The research of van den Bosch has amongst other topics focused on memory-based learning, text mining and language variations. He has also developed computer programs which work on the interpretation of language, such as a self-learning spelling corrector.

Van den Bosch was elected a member of the Royal Netherlands Academy of Arts and Sciences in 2012.
