= Paul de Bakker =

Dutch bioinformatician (born 1973)

- Born: Paul I. Wen de Bakker; 24 August 1973; Rotterdam
- Education: University of Bristol; Utrecht University; University of Cambridge
- Known for: Computational genomics
- Scientific career
- Fields: Computational biology Genetic epidemiology
- Institutions: Harvard Medical School (2007–2012); University of Utrecht (2012–2015); Vertex Pharmaceuticals (2015–present)
- Thesis: Ab initio sampling of polypeptide conformations and the prediction of protein structure (2003)
- Doctoral advisor: Tom Blundell

Paul I. Wen de Bakker (born 1973) is a Dutch bioinformatician who specializes in computational biology and genetic epidemiology. He has been Senior Director of Computational Genomics at Vertex Pharmaceuticals since 2015. He previously worked at Harvard Medical School from 2007 to 2012, and served as Professor of Genetic Epidemiology and Bioinformatics at the University of Utrecht from 2012 to 2015. He is known for his research on the genetics of innate resistance to HIV.
