= Alexander Hugo Bakker Korff =

Dutch painter

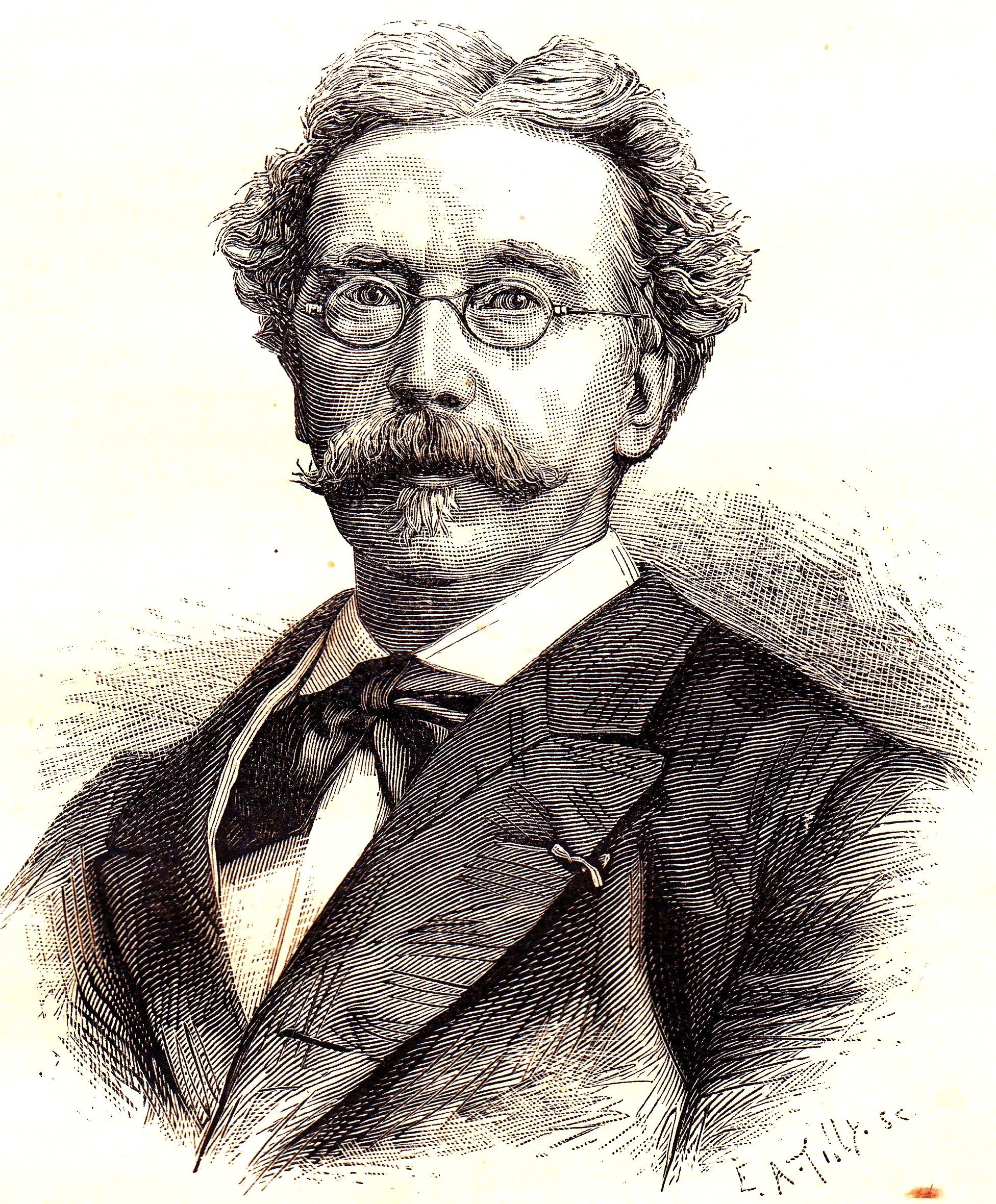

Alexander Hugo Bakker Korff' (1824 in The Hague – 1882 in Leiden), was a 19th-century Dutch genre painter.

== Biography ==
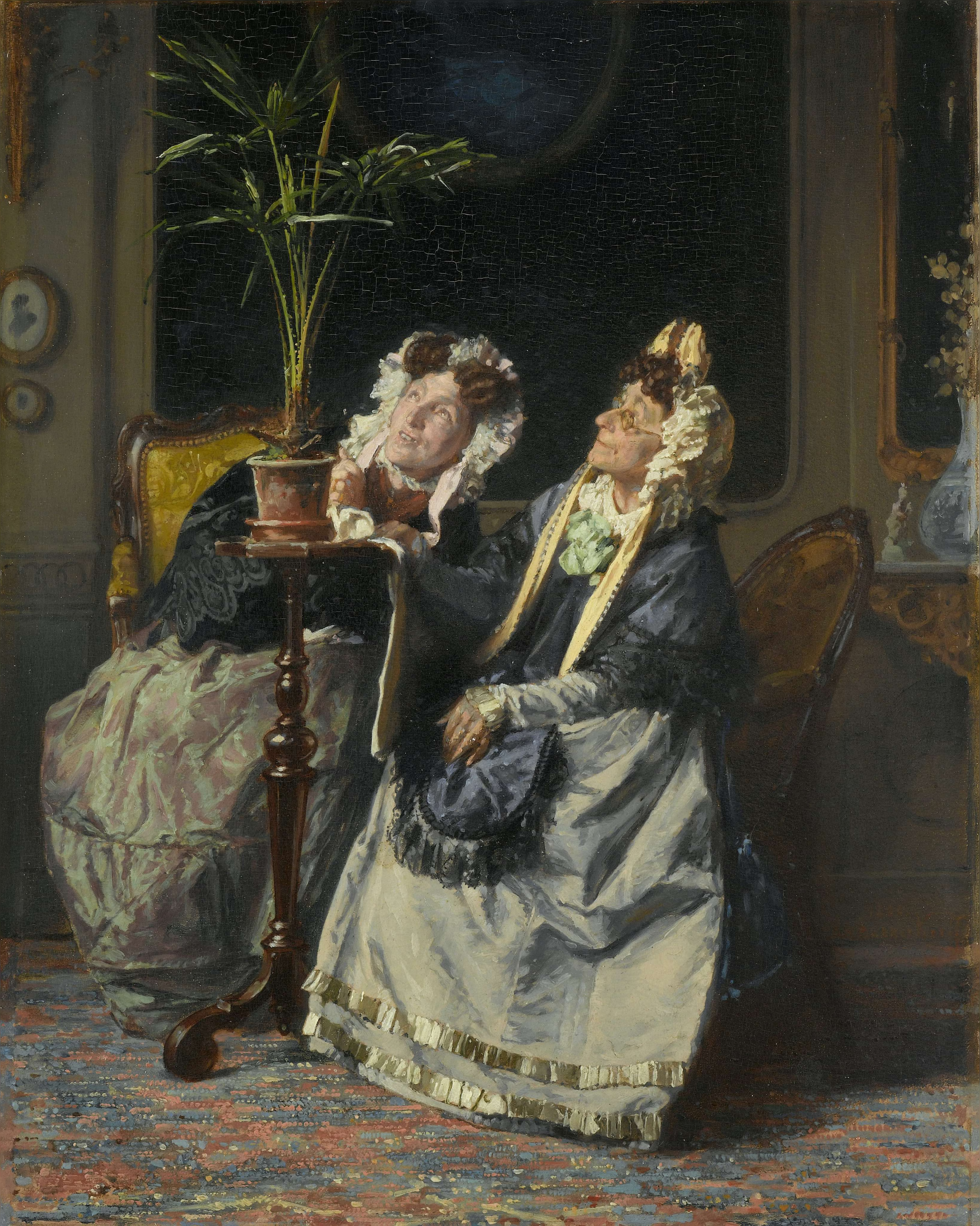
'Onder de palmen', Under the palms.

According to the RKD he was a pupil of the painters Cornelis Kruseman and Huib van Hove who became known for his "Bakker Korffjes" - genre pieces of ladies in caps in interiors, that he started painting in 1856 while he was living in Oegstgeest with his sisters as models. He was trained in the 1840s at the Koninklijke Academie van Beeldende Kunsten in the Hague and the Koninklijke Academie voor Schone Kunsten in Antwerp, where he followed lessons by Nicolaes de Keyser, among others. In 1870 he was awarded the title ridder in de Leopoldsorde after his works were presented at an exhibition in Brussels in 1869, and he was a member of the Pulchri studio who later became board member of the Leids Schilder- en Tekengenootschap Ars Aemula Naturae, an artist collective that dates back to 1799. His pupils were Dirk Leonardus Kooreman, Jan Hendrik van Rossum du Chattel, Elias Stark, Jan Jacob Zuidema Broos, and Mathilde Tonnet.

== See also ==
- Nicaise de Keyser
