= Appingedam =

Appingedam n Daam (Gronings)
- City
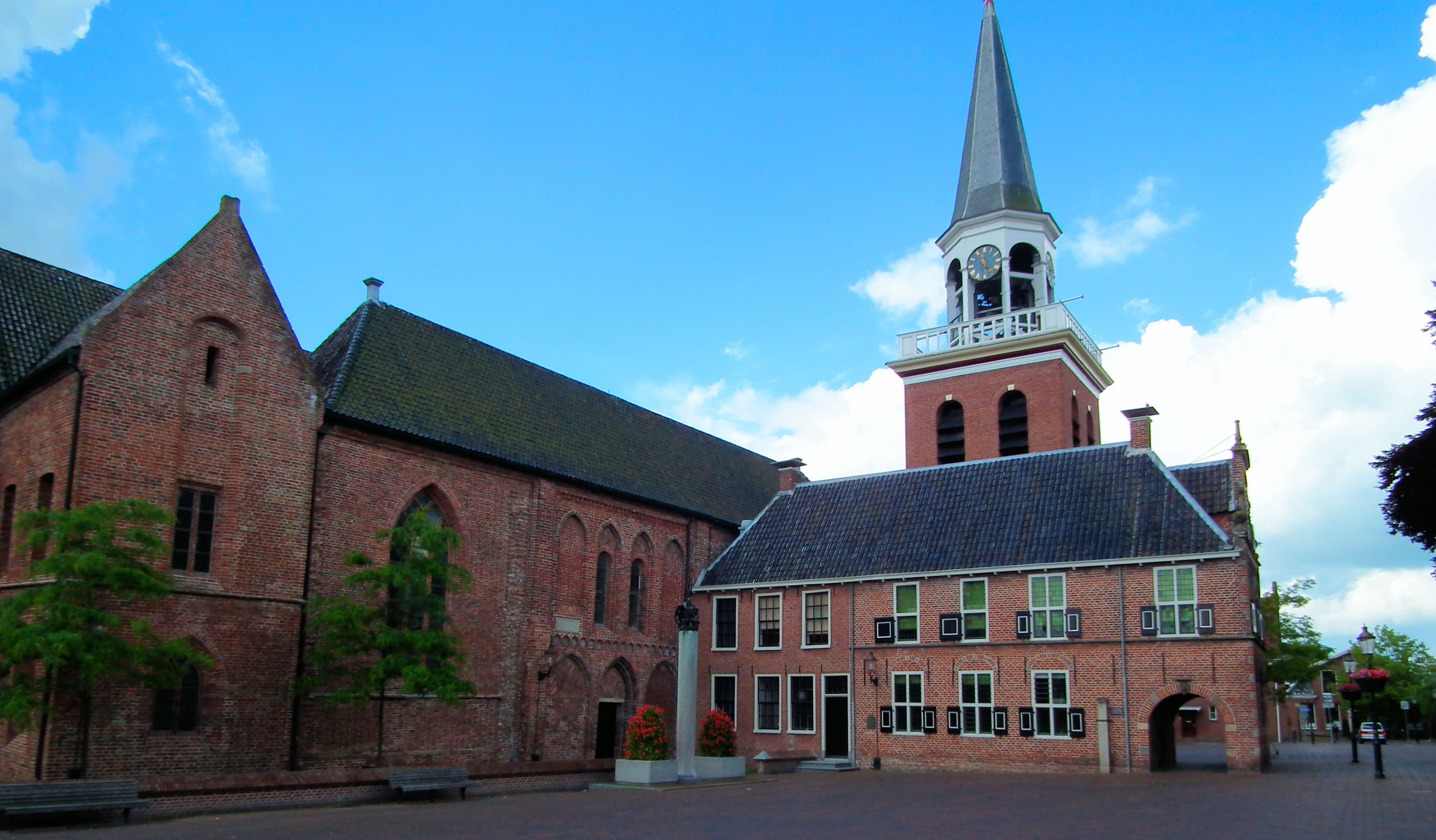
- Nicholas Church (left) and renaissance town hall (right) in Appingedam

- Flag Coat of arms

- Location in Groningen

- Location in the Netherlands Appingedam (Netherlands)
- Coordinates: 53°19′N 6°52′E
- Country: Netherlands
- Province: Groningen
- Municipality: Eemsdelta

Area
  - Total: 24.58 km^{2} (9.49 sq mi)
  - Land: 23.78 km^{2} (9.18 sq mi)
  - Water: 0.80 km^{2} (0.31 sq mi)
- Elevation: 0 m (0 ft)

Population (01-01-2023)
  - Total: 11,085
- Demonym: Appingedammer Locally known as "Damsters"
- Time zone: UTC+1 (CET)
  - Summer (DST): UTC+2 (CEST)
- Postcode: 9900–9903
- Area code: 0596

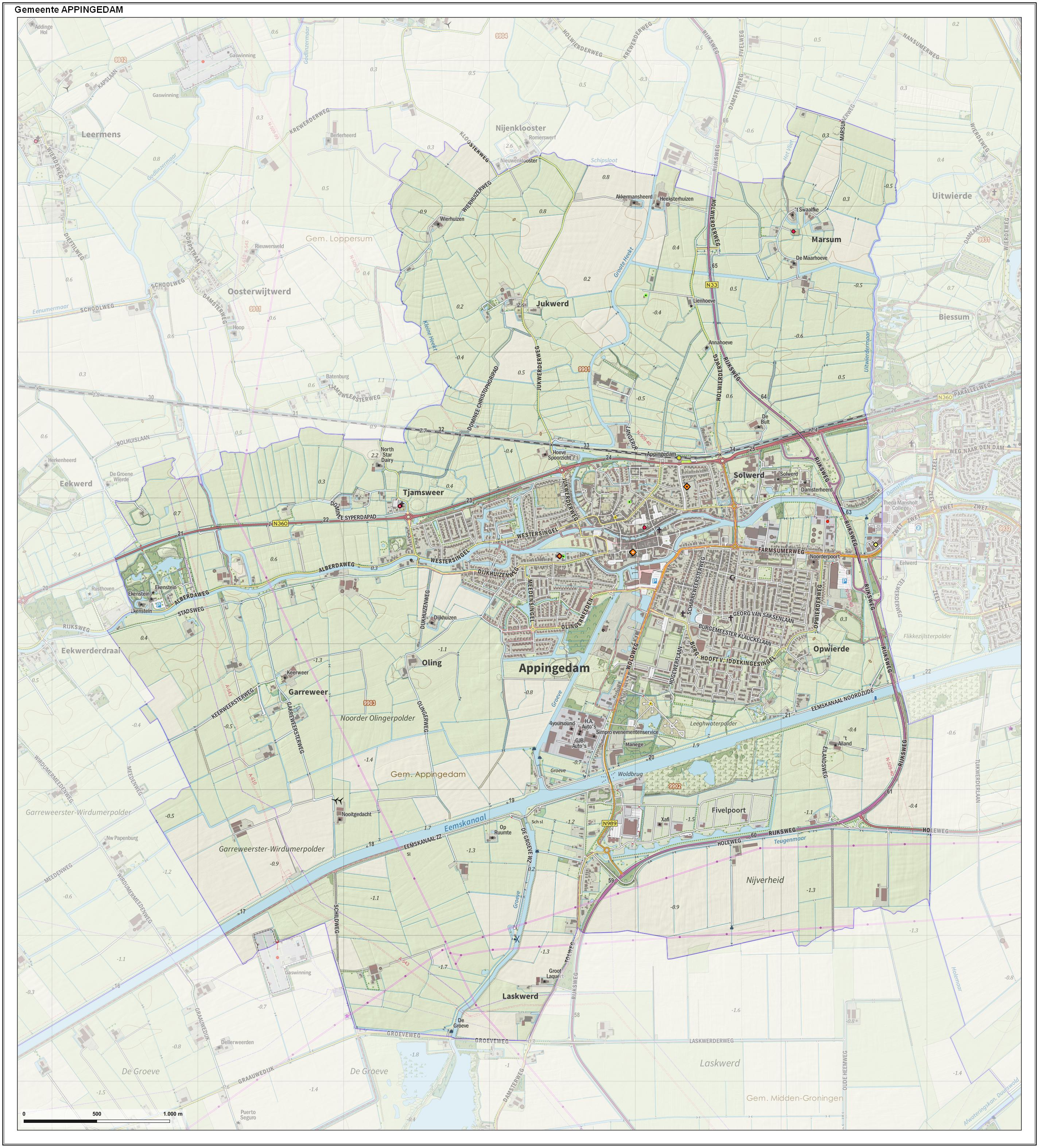
Topographic map of Appingedam, September 2014

Appingedam (Dutch: [ˌɑpɪŋəˈdɑm]; Gronings: n Daam [n̩ˈdaːm]) is a city and former municipality in the northeastern Netherlands. Although there is no certainty as to the exact age of Appingedam, historical research demonstrates that the place in which the city would eventually be built had been inhabited for over a millennium. Specifically, the area in which the earliest traces of human settlements have been reported is the Wierde, a quarter located in the northern part of the city centre. Today, a narrow, winding street by the same name runs along the waterfront as a living testimony to the times gone by. The characteristic landmarks of the old Wierde are still recognisable today: the historical East-West Canal, called “Diep,” dug to the south of the Wierde, diked on both sides, still defines the unique layout of the downtown Appingedam.

Little is known about the exact age and origin of the name of Appingedam. It came into existence on the banks of the Delf, the present Damsterdiep, around 1200. The name originates from a dam built in the Appe or Apt. In 1327, Appingedam received city rights from the free Frisians of the Upstalboom near the East Frisian city of Aurich. Appingedam and Aurich still have friendly liaisons via a partnership called the Städtepartnerschaft or stedenband, in German and Dutch respectively. Appingedam is located in the region Fivelingo, which in the Middle Ages was a part of Frisia.

In the Late Middle Ages, Appingedam, being a seaport, was an important trading competitor to Groningen. When Groningen received the staple right, Appingedam rapidly lost its trading position. Later on Delfzijl outstripped Appingedam with its newer and bigger seaport.

Nowadays Appingedam still looks indispensable as a small city. Many original medieval premises can be found in the centre. The most famous sight is the hanging kitchens above the Damsterdiep. Appingedam was home to the Appingedammer Bronsmotorenfabriek that produced large ship's engines for the shipyards in the area.

== History ==
=== Medieval Appingedam ===
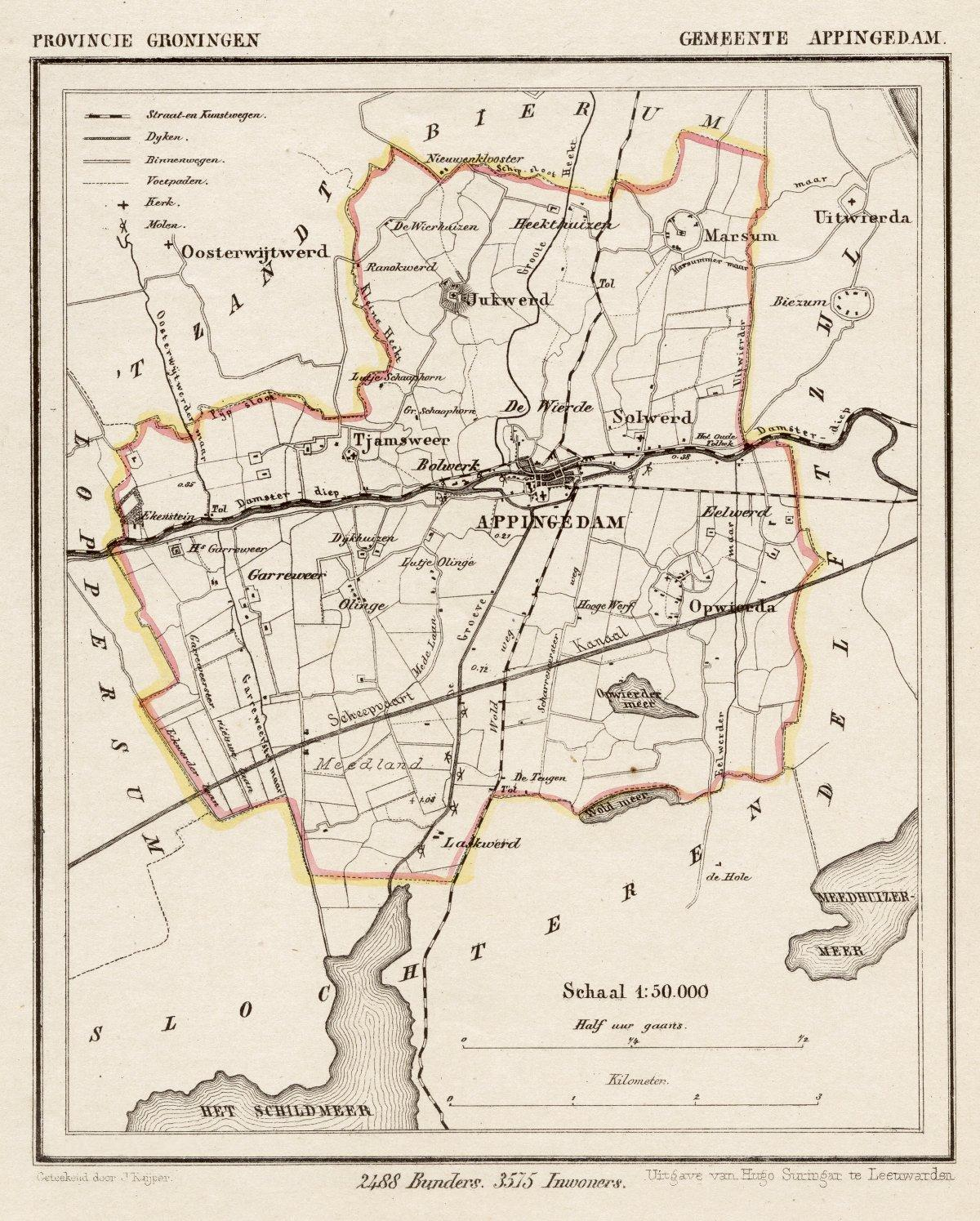
The municipality of Appingedam around 1866 (Atlas of the province of Groningen 1865-1870)

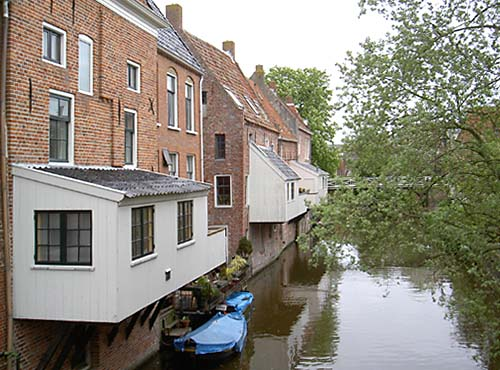
The hanging kitchens over the Damsterdiep

Appingedam evolved on the banks of the waterway of the Delf, today known as Damsterdiep, around 1200. The name of the town is a lexical compound meaning “the dam built in the Appe” or “Apt.” The junction of the Apt and the east–west canal proved convenient as a location for the foundation of a lively trade settlement. Established by shipmasters, tradesmen and craftsmen, Appingedam was first mentioned in a historical document dated 1224. Next to Groningen, Appingedam was thus the second of the two urban centres upon which the Frisian region of Fivelingo would build its fame in the Middle Ages.

=== Trade Centre ===
Owing to its favourable location at the junction of inland waterways and thus to its open access to the sea, the settlement soon developed into a vibrant centre for shipping and trade. With seagoing ships loading and unloading freight at its two busy quays located on the opposite banks of the canal, wealth would flow into the city. Stored in Appingedam and traded in its markets, the goods would subsequently be transported via inland waterways to the northern regions of Germany, Westfalia, and even further into the Baltic Sea area. The exchange of goods, continually contributing to the growing affluence of Appingedam, quickly rendered it the dominant city of Fivelingo.

=== The “Neighbour Letter” ===
An important seaport and a trade hub, mediaeval Appingedam would soon become a legally acknowledged administrative centre. In 1327, Appingedam's city rights were recognized by the Council associating representatives of seven Frisian sea states, who signed the treaty confirming Appingedam's independent status at Upstalboom, which today is the East Frisian city of Aurich. The rights and privileges granted to Appingedam were listed in a document which went down in history as the “Neighbour Letter.”

=== Further Developments ===
The City of Appingedam flourished over the next two centuries. The 14th century brought about the construction of a large church complex, a convent, a guesthouse and two fortified castles of Ripperda and Snelgersma. Work on the development of the system of canals and mooring docks continued well into the 15th century, and it is till this day that some of the 600-year-old structures may be admired along the winding waterfront avenue leading from Koningstraat to Westersingel.

=== Conflicts with the City of Groningen ===
The economic development of Appingedam would, however, increasingly threaten the vital interests of the City of Groningen. The growing tension between the two cities eventually escalates into a series of armed conflicts. In 1536, Appingedam suffered a major defeat, as a consequence of which the city was destroyed and ultimately lost its position as a major player in the region's trade and politics. Although since then Appingedam's economy would gradually deteriorate, a temporary revival could be observed in the 1630s, when the City Hall was built and later, around 1760, when the reconstruction of the facades of the gabled houses in the Solwerdstraat commenced However, it was not until the end of the 18th century that the development of the city would regain its momentum: the turn of the centuries brought the establishment of regular railway services between Appingedam and Sneek, Amsterdam, and a few German cities, but it was only in 1884 that the city received a new railway station, representing an architectural style known as the Sneek-Standard-Style.

=== Traditional Industries ===
Along the Damsterdiep, a number of businesses—foundries, brickworks, limestone quarries, sawmills, and other industries supporting the dockyard operations or related to the region's agricultural production—emerged over the years. Catering to the needs of the local bakeries and of trading companies, the nearby windmills would produce flour and the local oil presses would supply oil, but apart from these industries, the City of Appingedam also boasted six beer breweries, two gin distilleries, several tanneries, spinning factories and many other production companies.

=== "Brons" Engine Factory ===
The economic boom of the late 19th century, propelled by the increase of the value of the cattle markets and, in particular, development of the horse market, allowed Appingedam to thrive again. Even though the importance of the waterways decreased after the Groningen-Delfzijl railway line opened, at the beginning of the 20th century thus diminishing Appingedam's profits on water transportation, the former trade hub reinvented itself as a major industrial centre in the region of Fivelingo. In 1870, C. Roggenkamp implemented the first steam-engine in Appingedam and founded the first steam-propelled sawmill timber in the Netherlands. Soon thereafter, other steam-run machines were implemented in Appingedam factories, further increasing the wealth of the city: a threshing machine and a crank press. At the beginning of the 20th century, the City already boasted a dairy factory, a flax factory, a cardboard manufacture, gasworks, a trailer factory, as well as the plants of busbuilders Medema and Smit. The "Bronsmotorenfabriek" (Brons Engine Factory), Ter Borg & Mensinga, an Appingedam-based mechanical plant named after its founder Jan Brons, gained international fame when its foundry produced the first Brons engine, catering for the needs of modern shipping, enjoying worldwide sales. The huge crankshaft of the first “Source” model may be admired today at the corner of the Kniestraat and Dijkstraat, as an industrial monument. Another mechanical plant with worldwide sales was Ter Borg & Mensinga.

=== Post-War Appingedam: A Battered Town ===
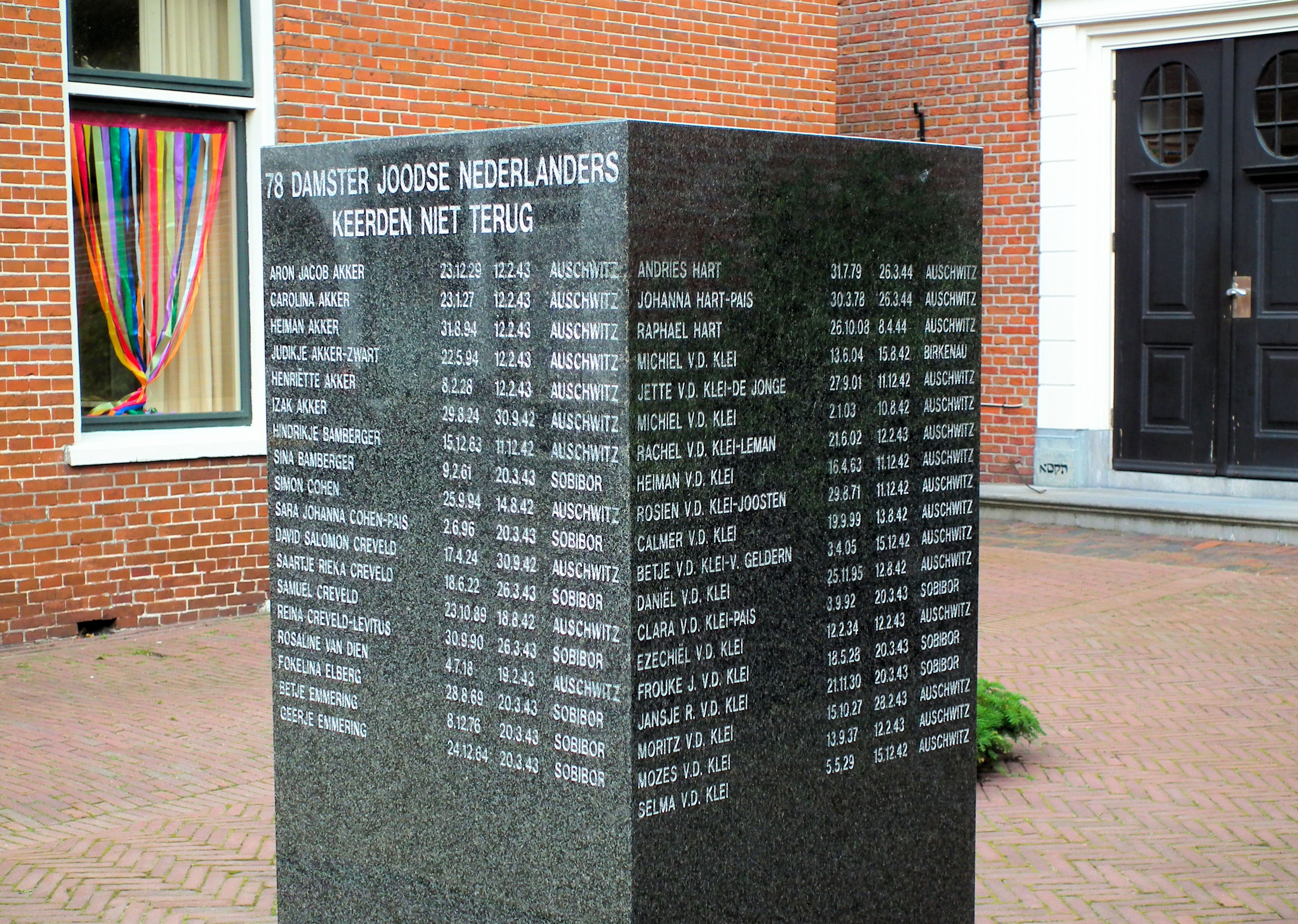
This monument to 78 Jews killed at the Auschwitz and Sobibor concentration camps stands in front of the former Synagogue (Appingedam) at Broerstraat 6

At the end of World War II, unlike the remaining regions of the Netherlands, the Eemsmondsregio, Appingedam and Delfzijl suffered major damage as a result of heavy shellings by the Nazi artillery. Many of the Appingedammers (or Damsters) were evacuated and the city itself, guarded by a handful of defenders, would suffer a ten-day-long agony until May 2, 1945, when it was eventually liberated by the Canadian troops. The returning inhabitants found their hometown heavily battered and even though its reconstruction commenced immediately, it took decades to restore Appingedam to its present glory.

=== “The Face of the Town”: Appingedam Under Protection ===
Immediately after World War II, Appingedam's star became largely eclipsed by the neighbouring city of Delfzijl, which developed rapidly and gained the status of the third port of the Netherlands and one of the most important industrial centres in the north of the country. In Appingedam, the transformations took much more time and in some areas of its economy, such as shopping, a standstill could be observed. The much needed incentive to speed up the change came in 1972, when the Appingedam acquired the status of a conservation area. This opened new legal and financial opportunities before the City Council, which thus gained the means to jump-start restoration, breathing new life into the rundown inner city. Ambitious plans to restore the historic centre of Appingedam in keeping with its unique, centuries-old identity were soon devised and implemented at an enviable pace.

=== Damsterdiep ===
The restoration of the downtown Damster proved to carry major consequences. Not only was the physical appearance of the city reverted to the state of its former glory, but also the life of Appingedam gained momentum. Under the motto of “Appingedam—Back in Service,” the council made a successful attempt to draw tourists and entrepreneurs back to city. The development of Appingedam involved the activation of the recreational sector, the effects of which would become particularly visible after the opening of the Damsterdiep sailing circuit. The city would quickly expand; modern homes in large housing estates or cosy suburban areas would quickly spring up and a variety of shops and attractive recreational facilities, good roads and efficient public transportation would become landmarks of the present day Appingedam. Today, Appingedam is a major tourist centre for the North-East of the province of Groningen. It has also developed into regional “care centre,” both in terms of governance, and in the field of education and shopping facilities.

=== Overdiep ===
Overdiep is the most recent project in the field of town renewal in Appingedam. It is a large-scale living, shopping and recreation complex, which is characterised by sympathetic architecture that blends with the character of the old centre of Appingedam. The venue takes its name from the new Diep, which forms the border between the old centre of the city and the surrounding area. Overdiep borders directly to the historical centre of Appingedam, with splendid visibility on the Nicolaïkerk and surroundings. In 2009, the first houses were constructed along with a health centre, as well as a new yacht-basin and pavilion. The last phase of the complex was realised in 2011.

== Population centres ==
- Appingedam
- Garreweer
- Jukwerd
- Laskwerd
- Marsum
- Oling
- Opwierde
- Solwerd
- Tjamsweer

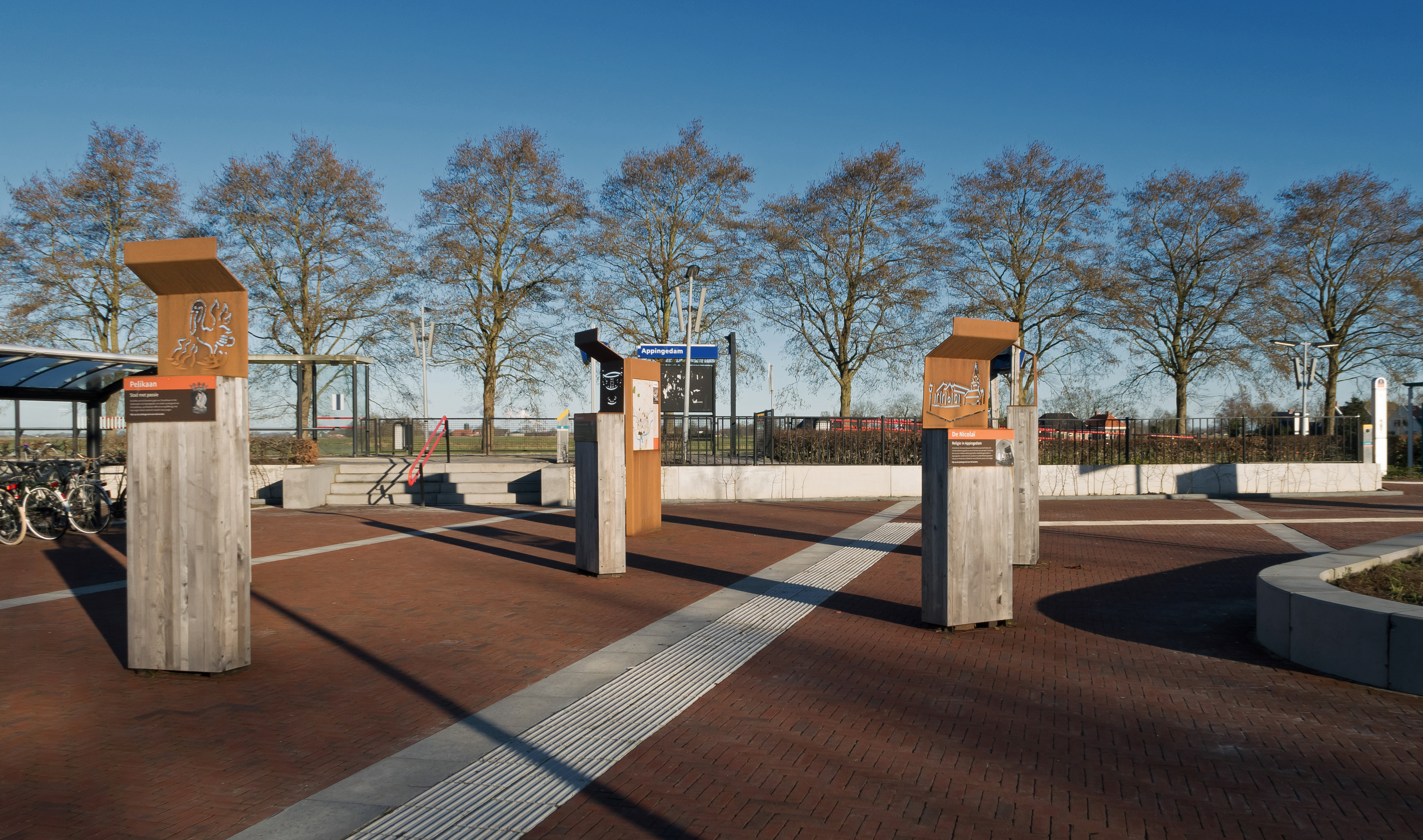
Railway station Appingedam

== Transport ==
Appingedam's railway station is Appingedam railway station.

== Sport ==
=== Cycling ===
Appingedam hosted the start and finish of the first stage at the 2012 Energiewacht Tour (individual time trial) and the 3b stage at the 2013 Energiewacht Tour.

== People from Appingedam ==
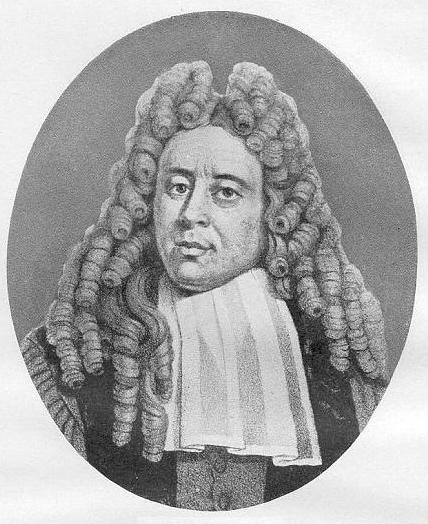
Jakob Perizonius

- Perizonius (1651–1715) real name Jakob Voorbroek was a classical scholar
- Jan ten Brink (1834–1901) a Dutch writer.
- Rudolph Cleveringa (1894–1980) professor of law at Leiden University
- Geert Bakker (1921–1993) a sailor, competed at the 1976 Summer Olympics
- Leendert Bosch (1924–2017) a Dutch biochemist and academic
- Klaas Bolt (1927–1990) classical organist and improviser
- Evelien Koogje (born 1959) retired rower, competed at the 1976 Summer Olympics
- Nathalie de Vries (born 1965) A Dutch architect, lecturer and urbanist
