= Kees Bakker =

Dutch academic

Kornelis "Kees" Bakker (28 April 1931, Winterswijk – 3 November 2010, Warmond) was Professor at Leiden University Faculty of Ecology.

During his PhD research he studied the intra and inter specific competition of Drosophila in detailed lab experiments. After his postdoc period in Silwood Park (Imperial College of London) he returned to Leiden. There he conducted a research program on parasite-host relations, with evolutionairy-ecological subjects like competition, host selection, parasital behaviour, parasital defense systems, optimized food collection behaviour and sex ratio-evolution.

He was a member of the Koninklijke Nederlandse Akademie van Wetenschappen since 1982 and the Koninklijke Hollandsche Maatschappij der Wetenschappen, Honorary Member of the British Ecological Society.
