= Erik Bakkers =

Dutch physicist

Erik Petrus Antonius Maria Bakkers (born 18 December 1972, in Kaatsheuvel) is a professor at the physics departments of both the Eindhoven and Delft Universities of Technology. His research concentrates on the growth and properties of semiconducting nanowires, the use of wires for solar cells, thermoelectric devices, and quantum computation. He received his PhD from the Utrecht University with the thesis "Charge transfer between semiconductor nanocrystals and a metal", which was focused on charge transfer between quantum dots. He worked at Philips Research labs in Eindhoven for 9 years before moving back to academia. Bakkers received the Technical Review award from MIT in 2007, a VICI award in 2010, and the Science AAAS Newcomb Cleveland Prize in 2013.

Bakkers was elected a member of the Royal Netherlands Academy of Arts and Sciences in 2020.
