= Hermann von der Dunk =

Dutch academic and historian (1928–2018)

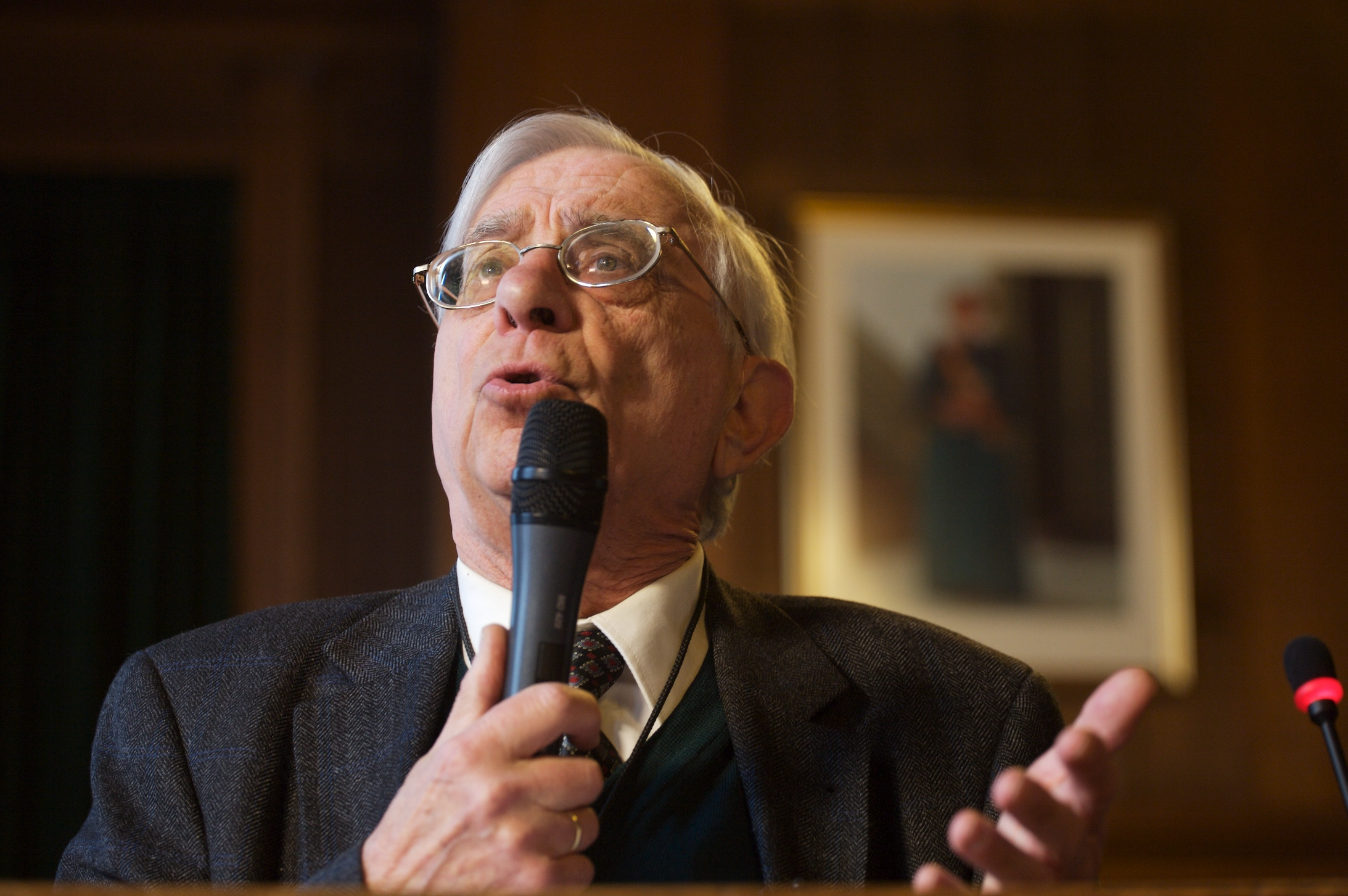
Hermann von der Dunk (2008)

Hermann Walther von der Dunk (9 October 1928 in Bonn – 22 August 2018 in Bilthoven) was a Dutch historian of German origin.

== Early life and education ==
Von der Dunk's family fled from Nazi-Germany to the Netherlands in 1937. As his mother was Jewish, his father could not find any work under National Socialist regime. His father found a position at the school of Kees Boeke in Bilthoven.

Later, Hermann von der Dunk visited the nearby Utrecht University. There, he studied history under professor Pieter Geyl and later studied at the Leibniz Institute of European History in Mainz. In 1966, he finished his dissertation (in German) on "Der Deutsche Vormärz und Belgien, 1830–1848" ("The German Vormärz and Belgium, 1830–1848").

== Career ==
One year later, in 1967, von der Dunk became professor for modern and contemporary history as well as cultural history at Utrecht University and stayed in this position until 1990. His early retirement was (at least in part) a reaction to the commercialization and bureaucratization of the universities. He specialized in European and Dutch history, as well as Dutch–German relationships. Much of his work focused on "modernity and anti-modern responses". He wrote several monographs and regularly published articles in Dutch newspapers and journals. In 1995, he received the Goethe Medal.

He was elected a member of the Royal Netherlands Academy of Arts and Sciences in 1986.

== Works ==
- Der Deutsche Vormärz und Belgien, 1830/48. Wiesbaden, F. Steiner, 1966.
- De verdwijnende hemel. Over de cultuur van Europa in de twintigste eeuw. 2 volumes. Amsterdam, Meulenhoff, 2000. ISBN 9789029068505
