= Meertens Institute =

Dutch research institute

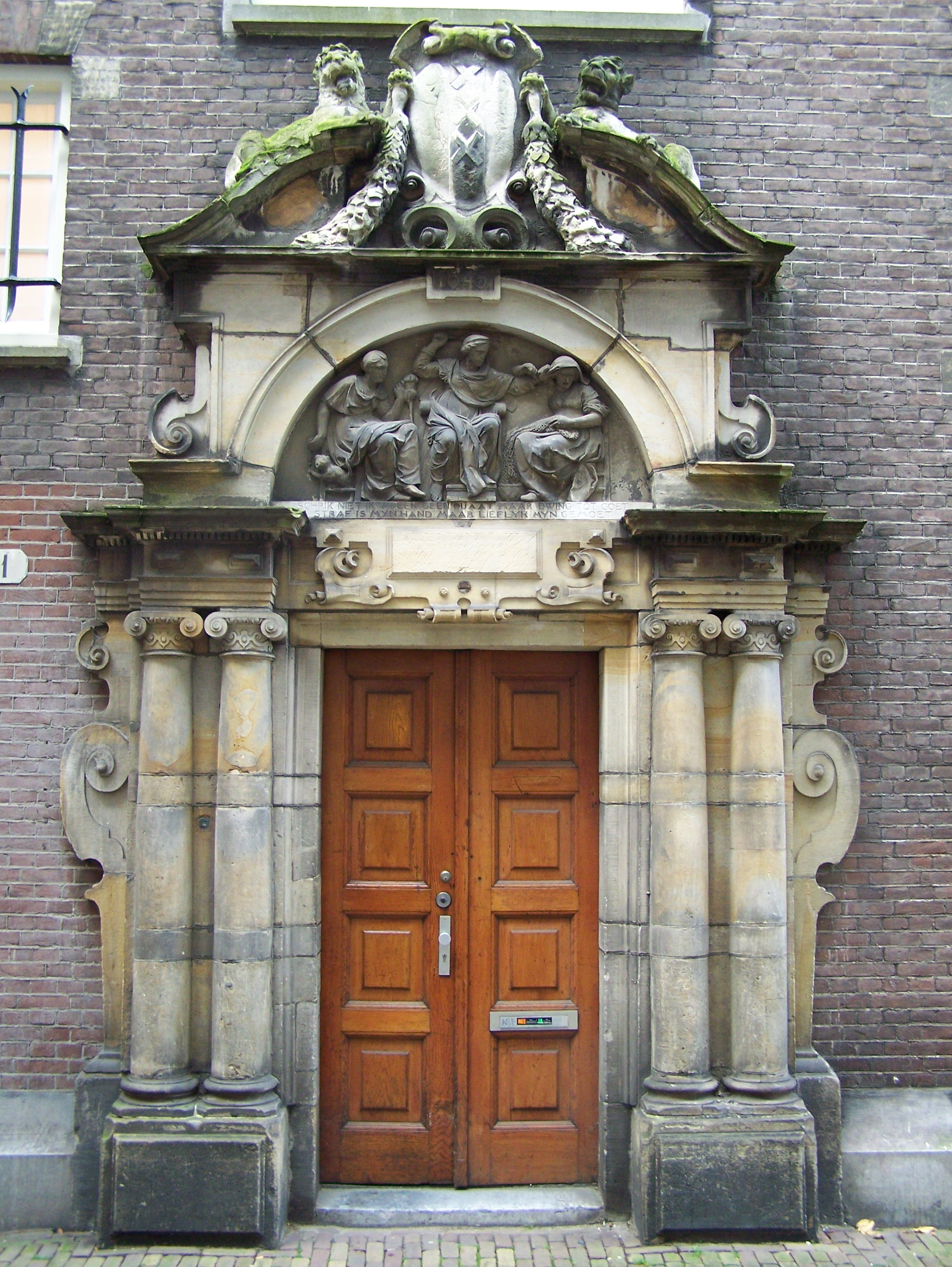
- Meertens Instituut (2016)
- Founder: P.J. Meertens
- Established: 1930
- Focus: Linguistic and cultural diversity in the Netherlands
- Interim Director: Marianne de Laet
- Location: Amsterdam, Netherlands
- Website: www.meertens.knaw.nl/cms/en/

The Meertens Institute (Dutch Meertens Instituut) in Amsterdam is a research institute which studies and documents language and culture in the Netherlands as well as Dutch language and culture throughout the world. The institute is part of the Royal Netherlands Academy of Arts and Sciences (Koninklijke Nederlandse Akademie van Wetenschappen or KNAW).

Its two departments are Ethnology and oral culture, which studies and documents culture of everyday life in the Netherlands from an international, comparative, and historical perspective, and Language variation, which studies and documents language, language variation and language change in the Netherlands, as well as Dutch languages in the world.

== History ==
The institute began in 1930 as a Dialect Office; the Folklore office was added in 1940, and Onomastics Office in 1948. These three bureaus came under the umbrella of the Central Commission for Dutch Social Research. The Secretary of the three bureaus, P.J. Meertens, was the first director and retired in 1965. The institute was renamed PJ Meertens Institute in 1979. In 1998 it was renamed as simply the Meertens Institute. Since 2001, the institute also houses the Secretariat of the International Society for Ethnology and Folklore (SIEF). In September 2016 the Meertens moved to the historic 'Spinhuis' building in downtown Amsterdam, jointly with the Huygens Institute, focusing on the history and culture of the Netherlands (also a KNAW institute, coming from The Hague). Since October 2016, together with the Huygens Institute and the International Institute of Social History, the institute is part of the newly formed KNAW Humanities Cluster.

The ethnology department is well known for its research in and databases on Dutch songs and folktales, pilgrimage culture and saint cults, probate inventories, farmhouses, feast and rituals and religious cultures. The audio collection in the field of phonetics with recordings in the field of speech acquisition and dialects, formed at the University of Amsterdam by Dr. Louise Kaiser and Meertens, is housed at the Meertens Institute.

== Directors ==
Name	Years	Citations
Piet Meertens	1948–1965	
Dick Blok	1965–1986	
Jaap van Marle	1986–1997	
Hans Bennis	1998-2016	
Antal van den Bosch	2017–2022	
Inger Leemans	2022–2024	
Marianne de Laet	2024–current	
