= Nico van Breemen =

Dutch soil scientist (born 1942)

Nico van Breemen (born 9 July 1942) is a Dutch soil scientist. He was a professor of pedogenesis at Wageningen University and Research Centre between 1986 and 2004.

== Career ==
Van Breemen was born in Haarlem on 9 July 1942. He obtained a degree in soil science and soil chemistry in 1968. He obtained his doctorate at Wageningen University in 1976. His thesis was titled :"Genesis and solution chemistry of acid sulfate soils in Thailand". Between 1986 and 2004 he was a professor of pedogenesis at Wageningen University.

In 1982, Van Breemen's self acclaimed most important paper was published in Nature. In the article Van Breemen found that ammonia in the air around areas of intensive animal farming was an important source of air pollution and soil acidification. Van Breemen found high levels of ammonium in water running down trees in these areas and it was established that the nitrogen in the chemical compound was precipitated from ammonia in the air. With the discovery he was able to demonstrate how nitrogen-poor Dutch nature areas became more rich in nitrogen. The discovery was a serendipitous find. During his career Van Breemen also performed research on the production of methane during rice growing. The result of the research being that improved crop produce resulted in lower methane production.

He retired on 30 September 2004 and opened an art gallery with his wife on the same day.

Van Breemen was elected a member of the Royal Netherlands Academy of Arts and Sciences in 1998.
