= Mark Bovens =

Dutch scholar of public administration

Marcus Alphons Petrus "Mark" Bovens (born 6 December 1957) is a Dutch scholar of public administration. He has been professor of public administration at Utrecht University since 2000. Bovens has been a member of the Scientific Council for Government Policy since 2013.

== Career ==
Bovens was born in The Hague on 6 December 1957. After attending the gymnasium he studied Dutch law, political science and philosophy at Leiden University and the Columbia Law School of Columbia University where he graduated in 1983. He obtained his title of doctor under H.R. van Gunsteren at Leiden University in 1990, his thesis was titled: Verantwoordelijkheid en organisatie. Beschouwingen over aansprakelijkheid, institutioneel burgerschap en ambtelijke ongehoorzaamheid."

Bovens was a teacher at Leiden University from 1983 to 1989. From 1990 onwards he was lecturer. In 1997 Bovens was appointed as professor of philosophy of law at Utrecht University. In 2000 he switched to become professor of public administration. Bovens specializes in accountability issues in and of public administration, whistleblowing, trust in government, meritocracy and education gaps in politics in society, and success of policy.

He has been a member of the Dutch Scientific Council for Government Policy since 2013. In 2014, as member of the council, he warned for growing inequality between people of low and high education levels in the Netherlands, and the possible consequences this could have for the manageability of the country.

== Honours and awards ==
Bovens was elected a member of the Royal Netherlands Academy of Arts and Sciences in 2008. He has been a Fellow of the American National Academy of Public Administration since 2013.
