= Members of the Royal Netherlands Academy of Arts and Sciences =

The Royal Netherlands Academy of Arts and Sciences (Dutch: Koninklijke Nederlandse Akademie van Wetenschappen, abbreviated: KNAW) is an organization dedicated to the advancement of science and literature in the Netherlands. The academy is housed in the Trippenhuis in Amsterdam. Founded in 1808, members are appointed for life by co-optation.

== Lists of members sorted alphabetically ==
- Members of the Royal Netherlands Academy of Arts and Sciences (A)
- Members of the Royal Netherlands Academy of Arts and Sciences (B)
- Members of the Royal Netherlands Academy of Arts and Sciences (C)
- Members of the Royal Netherlands Academy of Arts and Sciences (D)
- Members of the Royal Netherlands Academy of Arts and Sciences (E)
- Members of the Royal Netherlands Academy of Arts and Sciences (F)
- Members of the Royal Netherlands Academy of Arts and Sciences (G)
- Members of the Royal Netherlands Academy of Arts and Sciences (H)
- Members of the Royal Netherlands Academy of Arts and Sciences (I)
- Members of the Royal Netherlands Academy of Arts and Sciences (J)
- Members of the Royal Netherlands Academy of Arts and Sciences (K)
- Members of the Royal Netherlands Academy of Arts and Sciences (L)
- Members of the Royal Netherlands Academy of Arts and Sciences (M)
- Members of the Royal Netherlands Academy of Arts and Sciences (N)
- Members of the Royal Netherlands Academy of Arts and Sciences (O)
- Members of the Royal Netherlands Academy of Arts and Sciences (P)
- Members of the Royal Netherlands Academy of Arts and Sciences (Q)
- Members of the Royal Netherlands Academy of Arts and Sciences (R)
- Members of the Royal Netherlands Academy of Arts and Sciences (S)
- Members of the Royal Netherlands Academy of Arts and Sciences (T)
- Members of the Royal Netherlands Academy of Arts and Sciences (U)
- Members of the Royal Netherlands Academy of Arts and Sciences (V)
- Members of the Royal Netherlands Academy of Arts and Sciences (W)
- Members of the Royal Netherlands Academy of Arts and Sciences (X)
- Members of the Royal Netherlands Academy of Arts and Sciences (Y)
- Members of the Royal Netherlands Academy of Arts and Sciences (Z)
