= Members of the Royal Netherlands Academy of Arts and Sciences (G) =

The Royal Netherlands Academy of Arts and Sciences (Dutch: Koninklijke Nederlandse Akademie van Wetenschappen, abbreviated: KNAW) is an organization dedicated to the advancement of science and literature in the Netherlands. The academy is housed in the Trippenhuis in Amsterdam. Founded in 1808, members are appointed for life by co-optation.

== List of members (G) ==
Name	Type	Division	Date of election	Notes	Ref.
Paulus Joseph Gabriël					
L.P. Gachard					
Ivan Gadourek				Died 2013.	
P.J. Gaillard					
T. Gaisford					
M.A. Galdi					
Hans Galjaard	Member				
L. Gallait					
Frans Lodewijk Ganshof					
Sir Alan Gardiner					
Florentino Garcìa Martìnez	Foreign Member				
Étienne-Barthélémy Garnier					
G. Garrattoni					
C.F. Gauss					
L.J. Gay Lussac					
Jacobus Geel					
Sara van de Geer	Corresponding Member				
K. Gegenbauer					
H. Gehle					
D.C. Geijskes					
Andre Geim	Corresponding Member				
Geert Jan van Gelder	Member				
Herman Arend Enno van Gelder					
H. van Gelder					
J.G. van Gelder					
J. van Gelderen					
Guillaume van Gemert	Member				
B. Gemser					
Herman van Genderen					
Pierre-Gilles de Gennes					
Christianus Petrus Antonius Geppaart					
George Joseph Gérard					
Baron Francois Pascal Simon Gérard					
Janneke Gerards	Member				
Pieter Gerbenzon					
Mia I. Gerhardt					
Walter Maurice Marie Louis Van Gerven					
H.K. Gerson					
Peter Geschiere	Member				
J. van Geuns					
Matthias van Geuns					
Hans Geuze	Member				
Pieter C.A. Geyl					
Halleh Ghorashi	Member				
J.W. Gibbs					
R. Giel					
Stan Gielen	Member				
Jenny Gierveld	Member				
Ivo Giesen	Member				
Erik van der Giessen	Member				
A.E. van Giffen					
Jan van Gijn	Member				
N.C. de Gijselaar					
L.W. Gilbert					
J.J.S. Gilissen					
D. Gill					
Richard Gill	Member				
J. van Gilse					
E. Gilson					
Jan Willem Giltay					
John Alexander Tjon Joe Gin					
Jac. Ginneken, S.J.					
W.F. Gisolf					
Willem Hendrik Gispen	Member				
W. Glasbergen					
Cornelis Jan Glavimans					
Pieter Glavimans					
Gilles Lambert Godecharle					
Lambert François Godecharle					
M.H. Godefroi					
Ch. Godefroy					
Rainer Goebel	Member				
C. Goedhart					
M.J. de Goeje					
A. Goekoop					
Jacob Goeree	Foreign Member				
Jacques Goethals-Vercruysse					
J. van Gogh					
Israel Gohberg					
A.S. Goldberger					
S. Goldstein					
I. Goldziher					
C. Golgi					
Pieter Hendrik Goll van Franckenstein					
Johann Goll van Frankenstein (2)					
E.H.J. Gombrich					
J. Gonda					
J. Gondouin					
J.H.R. Göppert					
V. Gordon Childe					
Jacqueline van Gorkom	Corresponding Member				
K.W. van Gorkom					
E. Gorter					
C.J. Gorter (2)					
I.H. Gosses					
Anton van Goudoever					
Bernardus Hermanus Goudriaan					
Adrianus François Goudriaan					
S.A. Goudsmit					
J.E. Goudsmit					
Beatrice de Graaf	Member				
Jacob Gråberg af Hemsö					
G.B. Grassi					
Seerp Gratama					
J. van 's Gravenweert					
Jan de Greef					
Johan Hendrik Greidanus					
F.C. de Greuve					
Maria Grever	Member				
Louis Peter Grijp					
G. Grijns					
Philip Grime	Foreign Member				
Wilhelm Karl Grimm					
Jacob Ludwig Karl Grimm					
W.C.L. van der Grinten					
Cornelis Hubertus Carolus Grinwis					
Rick Grobbee	Member				
P. Groen					
Guillaume Groen van Prinsterer					
Petrus Johannes Groen van Prinsterer					
Kees Groeneboer	Corresponding Member				
W.P. Groeneveldt					
I. Groneman					
Marc Groenhuijsen	Member				
Rienk van Grondelle	Member				
B.A. van Groningen					
J.J.M. de Groot					
Adriaan Dingeman de Groot					
C.J. de Groot					
J.V. de Groot					
S.R. de Groot					
J. de Groot (2)					
L.J.J. Grootaers					
Piet P. Gros	Member				
Frank Grosveld	Member				
G. Grote					
M. Gruber					
Maarten van de Guchte	Corresponding Member				
François Pierre Guillaume Guizot					
R.H. van Gulik					
Johan Peter Gumbert					
F.L. Gunkel					
J.W. Gunning					
Jan Willem Gunning	Member				
Herman van Gunsteren	Member				
Wilfred van Gunsteren	Corresponding Member				
A.I. Gurevich					
Henricus Daniel Guyot					
J.A.H. Gyldén					
Holger Gzella	Member				
