= Members of the Royal Netherlands Academy of Arts and Sciences (A) =

The Royal Netherlands Academy of Arts and Sciences (Dutch: Koninklijke Nederlandse Akademie van Wetenschappen, abbreviated KNAW) is an organization dedicated to the advancement of science and literature in the Netherlands. The academy is housed in the Trippenhuis in Amsterdam. Founded in 1808, members are appointed for life by co-optation.

== List of members (A) ==
| Name | Type | Field | Election date | Notes |
|---|---|---|---|---|
| Willem Jan Aalders | | | | |
| Gerhard Jean Daniel Aalders H. Wzn | | | | |
| Wil van der Aalst | Member | Natural Sciences and Engineering | 2014 | |
| Kees Aarts | Member | Behavioural Sciences, Social Sciences and Law | 2011 | |
| Jacques Henrij Abendanon | | | | |
| Jan D. Achenbach | Corresponding Member | Natural Sciences and Engineering | 1999 | |
| Jan Ackersdijck | | | | |
| Willem Cornelis Ackersdijck, Jr | | | | |
| Gozewinus Acker Stratingh | | | | |
| Gerard Acket | Member | Natural Sciences and Engineering | 1991 | |
| Johannes Gerhardus Rijk Acquoy | | | | |
| William Adam | | | | |
| Pieter Adams | | | | |
| Friedrich von Adelung | | | | |
| Lord Edgar Douglas Adrian | | | | |
| Nicolaus Adriani | | | | |
| Henricus Aeneae | | | | |
| Remieg Aerts | Member | Humanities | 2011 | |
| Frits Agterberg | Corresponding Member | Natural Sciences and Engineering | 1981 | |
| Takuzo Aida | Foreign Member | Natural Sciences and Engineering | 2020 | |
| Anthony Johannes d'Ailly | | | | |
| Sir George Biddell Airy | | | | |
| Anna Akhmanova | Member | Medical, Biomedical and Health Sciences | 2015 | |
| Barbara Aland | Foreign Member | Humanities | 2006 | |
| Kurt Aland | | | | |
| Gale Bruno van Albada | | | | |
| Tjeerd van Albada | Member | Natural Sciences and Engineering | 1984 | |
| André Aleman | Member | Medical, Biomedical and Health Sciences | 2017 | |
| Jan M. M. Aler | | | | |
| Cornelis Alewijn | | | | |
| Keimpe Algra | Member | Humanities | 2004 | |
| Percy Stafford Allen | | | | |
| Maurits Allessie | Member | Medical, Biomedical and Health Sciences | 2003 | |
| Edoardo Amaldi | | | | |
| Victor A. Ambartsumian | | | | |
| Severin Amelinckx | | | | |
| Jan Amesz | | | | |
| Abraham des Amorie van der Hoeven | | | | |
| Tjeerd van Andel | | | | |
| Pietro Anderloni | | | | |
| Rudy Andeweg | Member | Behavioural Sciences, Social Sciences and Law | 2006 | |
| Anne Anema | | | | |
| Sigurd Angenent | Corresponding Member | Natural Sciences and Engineering | 1996 | |
| Frank Ankersmit | Member | Humanities | 1986 | |
| Johan Albert Ankum | | | | |
| Dionisio Anzilotti | | | | |
| L. J. van Apeldoorn | | | | |
| Cornelis Apostool | | | | |
| Dominique François Jean Arago | | | | |
| Cornelis van Arendonk | | | | |
| Josef Ferdinand Arens | | | | |
| Isabel Arends | Member | Natural Sciences and Engineering | 2017 | |
| Everhardus Jacobus Ariëns | | | | |
| Cornelius Ubbo Ariëns Kappers | | | | |
| J. (Hans) Ariëns Kappers | | | | |
| Willem Hendrik Arisz | | | | |
| Gerardus Anne van Arkel | | | | |
| Anton Eduard van Arkel | | | | |
| H. F. A. von Arnim | | | | |
| Herman Arntzenius | | | | |
| Robert Hendrik Arntzenius | | | | |
| Svante August Arrhenius | | | | |
| Baron Frederik Mari van Asbeck | | | | |
| Hubert Matthijs Adriaan Jan van Asch van Wijk | | | | |
| Miguel Asin y Palacios | | | | |
| Willem Jan Marie Anton Asselbergs | | | | |
| Cornelis Jacobus van Assen | | | | |
| Tobias Michaël Carel Asser | | | | |
| Cornelis Augustijn | | | | |
| Johan Baron d'Aulnis de Bourouill | | | | |
| Hans Gerhard Avé Lallemant | | | | |
| Ad van der Avoird | Member | Natural Sciences and Engineering | 1979 | |
