= Members of the Royal Netherlands Academy of Arts and Sciences (J) =

The Royal Netherlands Academy of Arts and Sciences (Dutch: Koninklijke Nederlandse Akademie van Wetenschappen, abbreviated: KNAW) is an organization dedicated to the advancement of science and literature in the Netherlands. The academy is housed in the Trippenhuis in Amsterdam. Founded in 1808, members are appointed for life by co-optation.

== List of members (J) ==
Name	Type	Division	Date of election	Notes	Ref.
Christian Friedrich Wilhelm Jacobs			1809		
E.R. Jacobson	Corresponding Member		1916		
Nikolaus Joseph von Jacquin			1809		
Vincent Jaddoe	Member	Medical, Biomedical and Health Sciences	2020		
F.M. Jaeger	Member		1915	Resigned in 1943.	
W. Jaffé	Foreign Member		1968		
Arie de Jager			1842		
Cornelis de Jager	Member	Natural Sciences and Engineering	1969		
R.O. Jakobson	Foreign Member		1960		
Anita Jansen	Member	Behavioural Sciences, Social Sciences and Law	2017		
B.C.P. Jansen	Corresponding Member		1927	Resigned in 1929. Re-admitted as Member in 1946.	
John Jansen	Member	Medical, Biomedical and Health Sciences	2008		
Willy Jansen	Member	Behavioural Sciences, Social Sciences and Law	2009		
Johan Jansonius	Corresponding Member	Natural Sciences and Engineering	1988		
J.M.L. Janssen	Member		1974		
L.J.F. Janssen			1837		
René Janssen	Member	Natural Sciences and Engineering	2011		
H.S. Jansz	Member		1984		
J.M.F. Jaspars	Corresponding Member		1981		
P.A.E.P. Jaubert			1809		
E. Jayme	Foreign Member	Behavioural Sciences, Social Sciences and Law	2005		
Thomas Jefferson			1809		
Lotte Jensen	Member	Humanities	2020		
J. Jeremias	Foreign Member		1958		
J.O.H. Jespersen	Foreign Member		1931		
Mike Jetten	Member	Natural Sciences and Engineering	2010		
H.J.M. Jeukens	Member		1983		
A.L.S. le Jeune			1825		
R. von Jhering	Foreign Member		1874		
Marian Joëls	Member	Medical, Biomedical and Health Sciences	2002		
J.F. Joliot	Foreign Member		1946		
W.J.A. Jonckbloet	Member		1855		
G.H. Jones	Foreign Member		1991		
A.W.K. de Jong	Corresponding Member		1910	Resigned in 1928.	
Ab de Jong	Member	Humanities	2010		
Aise de Jong	Corresponding Member	Natural Sciences and Engineering	2000		
F.J. de Jong	Member		1965		
Irene de Jong	Member	Humanities	2015		
J.W. de Jong	Corresponding Member		1978		
Louis de Jong	Member		1963		
Pieter de Jong	Member		1875		
Wybren de Jong	Corresponding Member		1991		
Jacob Jongbloed	Member		1949		
Jhr. Johannes Cornelis de Jonge			1820		
J.K.J. de Jonge	Member		1866		
Eddy de Jongh	Member	Humanities	1987		
Petra de Jongh	Member	Natural Sciences and Engineering	2018		
Samuel Elzevier de Jongh	Member		1950		
L.B.W. Jongkees	Member		1965		
J.C.G. Jonker	Corresponding Member		1898	Resigned in 1905. Re-admitted as Member in 1910.	
J.H.P. Jonxis	Member		1960		
J. Joosse	Member		1983		
Herman Jacques Jordan	Member		1928		
Thomas Theodoor Hendrikus Jorissen	Member		1874		
Joshua Jortner	Foreign Member	Natural Sciences and Engineering	1998		
Daniel Josephus Jitta	Member		1919		
J.P.B. de Josselin de Jong	Member		1921		
P.E. de Josselin de Jong	Member		1974		
J. Jud	Foreign Member		1946		
S.A. Julien	Member		1857		
H.W. Julius	Member		1947		
Victor August Julius	Member		1897		
Willem Henri Julius	Member		1897		
Pim Jungerius	Member	Natural Sciences and Engineering	1987		
F.W. Junghuhn	Corresponding Member		1855		
T.W.J. Juynboll			1840		
Th.W. Juynboll	Member		1914		
