= Members of the Royal Netherlands Academy of Arts and Sciences (H) =

The Royal Netherlands Academy of Arts and Sciences (Dutch: Koninklijke Nederlandse Akademie van Wetenschappen, abbreviated: KNAW) is an organization dedicated to the advancement of science and literature in the Netherlands. The academy is housed in the Trippenhuis in Amsterdam. Founded in 1808, members are appointed for life by co-optation.

== List of members (H) ==
Name	Type	Division	Date of election	Notes	Ref.
Arie Jan Haagen Smit					
Pieter de Haan					
W. de Haan					
F. de Haan					
C.A.M. Haanen					
M. de Haan Hettema					
Johannes Haantjes					
Dirk ter Haar					
Barend ter Haar, Bzn					
Bernard ter Haar (1)					
Wander Johannes de Haas					
Harm Habing	Member				
Gottfried von Haberler					
Joannes Josephus Habets					
Heinrich Hackmann					
Jacques S. Hadamard					
C.B. van Haeringen					
Roelof Arent Volkier baron van Haersolte					
Herman Haga					
Hendrik Laurens Hagedoorn					
Eduard Hageman					
Gunnar Hägg					
Gustav Per Engelbert Häggqvist					
Peter Hagoort	Member				
Hidde Halbertsma, Justuszn					
Justus Hiddes Halbertsma					
George Ellery Hale					
Constant Johann Jakob van Hall					
Jacob van Hall					
Herman Christiaan van Hall					
Maurits Cornelis van Hall					
J. Hallenberg					
A.M. Halliday	Foreign Member				
Arent van Halmael, jr.					
Dick van Halsema	Member				
Hendrik Arent Hamaker					
H.J. Hamaker					
Hartog Jacob Hamburger					
A.G. van Hamel					
A.J. von Hamilton					
L.L. Hammerich					
J. von Hammer Purgstall					
Wouter Hanegraaff	Member				
Baron Maximiliaan Louis van Hangest d'Yvoy van Mijdrecht					
G. Hanotaux					
Ronald Hanson	Member				
Cornelis van Hardenbergh					
Annette Harder	Member				
Anita Hardon	Member				
Frank van Harmelen	Member				
Ad. von Harnack					
A. van Harreveld					
Ph. van Harreveld, jr.					
R.G. Harrison					
Abraham van der Hart					
Joest 't Hart	Member				
Paul 't Hart	Member				
Pieter Harting					
D. Harting					
Arthur Hartkamp	Member				
J.J. Hartman					
Piet Hartman	Member				
M. Hartmann					
Joop Hartog	Member				
L. de Hartog					
J.P. den Hartog					
Ph.H. Hartz					
Francis Haskell					
A.D. Hasler					
C. H. E. Haspels					
Gerard van Hasselt					
Alexander Willem Michiel van Hasselt					
J.K. Hasskarl					
Trevor Hastie	Foreign Member				
Walter Haug					
René Just Haüy					
Henk ten Have	Corresponding Member				
Robert Haveman	Foreign Member				
E. Havinga					
E.H. Hazelhoff					
G.A.J. Hazeu					
C. Heath					
Albert Heck	Member				
G.A.O.F.A. (Georges) ridder van Hecke					
W.A. Hecker					
F. van Heek					
Arnold Hermann Ludwig Heeren					
K.H. Heeroma					
Martin van Hees	Member				
R.T. Hegnauer					
Paul van der Heijden	Member				
Sef Heijnen	Member				
Gert Jan van Heijst	Member				
I.M. Heilbron					
W.K. Heisenberg					
Olivier Hekster	Member				
Natali Helberger	Member				
G.J. Held					
W.G. Hellinga					
Lotte Hellinga-Querido	Corresponding Member				
C.J. Hellingwerff					
Frans van der Helm	Member				
F.R. Helmert					
H.L.F. von Helmholtz					
Amina Helmi	Member				
Coen Hemker	Member				
W.L. van Helten					
P.T. Helvetius van den Bergh					
Paulus van Hemert					
A.C.C.G. van Hemert					
Gotthilf Hempel	Foreign Member				
Petra Hendriks	Member				
Wybrand Hendriks					
Wessel Albertus van Hengel (1779-1871)					
Martin Hengel					
Kees Hengeveld	Member				
H.E. (Harold) Henkes					
F.G.J. Henle					
Johann Friedrich Hennert					
P. Hennipman					
J.F.J. Heremans					
Jodocus Heringa, Eliaszn.					
Adriaan Willem Hendrik van Herk					
J.A. Herklots					
Johann Gottfried Jakob Hermann					
C.F. Hermann					
J.J. Hermans					
Ch. Hermite					
Guillaume Jacques Herreyns					
C.J. Herrick					
J.F.W. Herschel					
E. Hertzsprung					
H. van Herwerden					
D.C. Hesseling					
Gerrit J. Hesselink					
Lambert Hesselink	Corresponding Member				
Jan van Hest	Member				
J.A.C. van Heusde					
Philip Willem van Heusde					
Ed van den Heuvel	Member				
Vincent van Heuven	Member				
Gerardus Heymans					
C.J.F. Heymans					
Christian Gottlob Heyne					
A. Heynsius					
Arend Heyting					
A.A. Hijmans van den Bergh					
D. Hilbert					
R. Hildebrand					
Frits Hilgen	Member				
Henk Hilhorst	Corresponding Member				
G.W. Hill					
Henk Hillenaar	Member				
Johannes Hinlopen					
T. Hirose	Foreign Member				
Ernst Hirsch Ballin	Member				
F.E.P. Hirzebruch					
J.J. Hisely					
Charles Howard Hodges					
Dorothy Mary Hodgkin Crowfoot					
Ph.J. Hoedemaeker					
Jan Hoeijmakers	Member				
M. Hoek					
Paulus Peronius Cato Hoek					
Sytze Hoekstra, Bzn					
Wiel Hoekstra	Member				
Jacob Hendrik Hoeufft					
J. van der Hoeve					
W.R. baron van Hoëvell					
G.W.W.C. van Hoëvell					
H. van der Hoeven					
Jan van der Hoeven					
Jo van der Hoeven					
Jacobus Hendrik van 't Hoff					
Bert Hofman	Member				
Corinne Hofman	Member				
Johann Joseph Hoffmann					
C.K. Hoffmann					
A.H. Hoffmann von Fallersleben					
A.W. von Hofmann					
Petrus Hofman Peerlkamp					
Remco van der Hofstad	Member				
Petrus Hofstede (2)					
P. Hofstede de Groot					
Evert Willem Hofstee					
Wim Hofstee	Member				
S. Hofstra					
Jan Hogendijk	Member				
Gijsbert Karel van Hogendorp					
Wim Hol	Member				
Frank den Hollander	Member				
K.F. Holle					
F.D. Holleman					
Arnold Frederik Holleman					
Cornelis Hollenberg	Corresponding Member				
A. Holmes					
A. Holst					
Gilles Holst					
A.C. Holtius					
M.W. Holtrop					
Johannes Willem Holtrop					
J.H. Holwerda					
A.E.J. Holwerda					
T.H. van den Honert					
P. Honig					
Henkjan Honing			2019		
Jan van Hooff	Member				
Daniël Hooft					
Gerard 't Hooft	Member				
Godefridus Johannes Hoogewerff					
Sebastiaan Hoogewerff					
Andries Hoogerwerf	Member				
Henry Hooghiemstra	Member				
J.D. Hooker					
Adriaan van der Hoop					
Adrianus de Hoop	Member				
J.G. de Hoop Scheffer					
Karel Joseph van Hoorebeeke					
C. Hooykaas					
Paul Hooykaas	Member				
R. Hooykaas					
Mary Horowitz	Foreign Member				
Thomas Horsfield					
C.J. van der Horst					
Piet van der Horst	Member				
Jeff de Hosson	Member				
Theo van den Hout	Corresponding Member				
Hendrik Samuel Houthakker					
M.Th. Houtsma					
J. A. van Houtte					
L.C.P. van Hove					
Bedrich Hrozny					
H.G. Hubbeling					
H.M. Huber					
Lawrence Hubert	Foreign Member				
Ambrosius Arnold Willem Hubrecht					
Wilhelm Huck	Member				
C.W. Hufeland					
P. van Huffel					
F.W.N. Hugenholtz					
Nico Hugenholtz	Member				
Gustav Hugo					
Ulrich Huguenin					
Jan Daniel Huichelbos van Liender					
T.H.J. Huisman					
J. Huizinga					
E. Huizinga					
J. Hulk					
J.G. Hulleman					
Suzanne Hulscher	Member				
R.A. d' Hulst					
Hendrik Christoffel van de Hulst					
Jan Hulswit					
Karel Jozef Emmanuel van Hulthem					
Carel Gerard Hultman					
Jean Emile Humbert					
David Pierre Giottino Humbert de Superville					
Alexander von Humboldt					
B. Hunningher					
Immanuel Gottlieb Huschke					
Piet Hut	Corresponding Member				
C. Hutton					
T.H. Huxley					
F.J.P. Hye-Schoutheer					
Robert Burchard Constantijn Huygens	Member				
