= Members of the Royal Netherlands Academy of Arts and Sciences (M) =

The Royal Netherlands Academy of Arts and Sciences (Dutch: Koninklijke Nederlandse Akademie van Wetenschappen, abbreviated: KNAW) is an organization dedicated to the advancement of science and literature in the Netherlands. The academy is housed in the Trippenhuis in Amsterdam. Founded in 1808, members are appointed for life by co-optation.

== List of members (M) ==
Name	Type	Division	Date of election	Notes	Ref.
Cornelis Felix van Maanen					
A. van Maanen					
H.J. van der Maas					
T. Macaulay					
Carolina Henriëtte MacGillavry					
Th.H. MacGillavry					
D.M. MacKay					
Eduard Louis Mackor					
J.N. Madvig					
Josephus Martinus Maria Maeijer					
J.B.L. Maes Canini					
R. Magnus					
G.L. Mahne					
A. Mai					
Peter Mair					
B.K. Malinowski					
Enno Mandema					
J.D. van Manen					
Jacob Ernst Marcus					
J. de Mare					
H.F.M. Mark					
A.H. van Markel Brouwer					
Paul Henri Marron					
H.I. Marrou					
J.C. Martens van Sevenhoven					
J.K.L. Martin					
Martinus van Marum					
G.C.C. Maspéro					
L.F.J. Massignon					
Carel Joannes Matthes					
B.F. Matthes					
G.L. von Maurer					
J. Maxwell					
J.Z. Mazel					
Peter Mazur					
J.P. Mazure					
G. van der McCall Theal					
Simon van der Meer					
F.G.L. van der Meer					
J.H. van der Meer					
baron Johan Meerman					
Lambertus Antonius van Meerten					
P.J. Meertens					
J.D. Meerwaldt					
G. Mees, Az.					
Willem Cornelis Mees					
Rudolf Adriaan Mees					
B.J.D. Meeuswe					
R.P. (Rein) Meijer					
E.M. Meijers					
Frits Louis Meijler					
A. Meillet					
Rudolph Meischke					
P.J.L.C. Melchior					
A.P. Melchior					
Machteld Johanna Mellink					
A.G.M. van Melsen					
Felix Mendelssohn Bartholdy					
Dirk Mentz					
E.D. Merrill					
Henri ter Meulen					
R. van der Meulen, Rzn.					
D. van der Meulen					
Jonas Daniel Meyer					
H. Meyer					
Gerrit Johan Meyer					
J.H.L. Meyer					
Ed. Meyer					
J.W. Meyer Ranneft					
H.A. Meyling					
Gerrit Jan Michaëlis					
Nicolaas Theodoor Michaëlis					
A.F. Michaut					
A. Michels					
P.C.E. Michot					
A.R. Miedema					
W.A. Mijsberg					
G.A. (George) Miller					
H.C. Millies					
A.L. Millin					
H. Milne Edwards					
Jan Pieter Minckelers					
Marcel Gilles Jozef Minnaert					
F.A.W. Miquel					
C.J.A. Mittermaier					
A.E.J. Modderman					
H. von Mohl					
Mrs. Christine A.E.M. Mohrmann					
H. Moissan					
W. Mol					
W.L.P.A. Molengraaff					
Gustaaf Adolf Frederik Molengraaff					
P.C. Molhuysen					
Johannes Hermannus Molkenboer					
J.W. Moll					
W. Moll					
Gerard (Gerrit) Moll					
H.E. Moltzer					
Arnaldo D. Momigliano					
Th. Mommsen					
C. von Monakow					
C.W. Mönnich					
J.L. Monod					
G. Monod					
Jan Baptiste van Mons					
Willem Gerrit Mook					
R.A. de Moor					
J.B. Moore					
J.P. Moquette					
Th.H. Morgan					
Louis Moritz					
J.L. Motley					
G. Mounin					
O.F.E. Mühlbock					
C. Mühlenfeldt					
Gerardus Johannes Mulder					
Johannes Mulder					
E. Mulder					
Claas Mulder (2)					
S. Muller					
J.J.A. Muller					
P.L. Muller					
Samuel Muller, Hzn					
Samuel Muller, Fzn					
Karl Otfried Müller					
F.M. Müller					
J. von Müller					
Johann Gotthard von Müller					
F. Muller Jzn.					
Friedrich Munter					
Herman Muntinghe					
Pieter van Musschenbroek					
Mrs. M.A. Muusses					

=== Living members ===
Name	Type	Division	Date of election	Notes	Ref.
Paul van der Maas	Member				
Johan Mackenbach	Member				
Kofi Makinwa	Member				
Jaap Mansfeld	Member				
Titti Mariani	Member				
Valentina Mazzucato	Member				
René Medema	Member				
Gerrit van Meer	Member				
Jos van der Meer	Member				
Bert Meijer	Member				
Eginhard Meijering	Member				
Andries Meijerink	Member				
Debora Meijers	Member				
Kees Melief	Member				
Don Mellenbergh	Member				
Steph Menken	Member				
Harald Merckelbach	Member				
Judi Mesman	Member				
Alice ter Meulen	Member				
Jacqueline Meulman	Member				
Antje Meyer	Member				
Birgit Meyer	Member				
John Michon	Member				
Jack Middelburg	Member				
Wijnand Mijnhardt	Member				
George Miley	Member				
Ieke Moerdijk	Member				
Annemarie Mol	Member				
Hans Mooij	Member				
Olav Moorman van Kappen	Member				
Maarten Mous	Member				
Nicolette Mout	Member				
Clara Mulder	Member				
Christine Mummery	Member				
Jaap Murre	Member				
Heleen Murre-van den Berg	Member				
Pieter Muysken	Member				
John Mydosh	Member				
Eddy van der Maarel	Corresponding Member				
Ejan Mackaay	Corresponding Member				
Joost Manassen	Corresponding Member				
Eric Mazur	Corresponding Member				
B. W. Meijer	Corresponding Member				
Gerard Meijer	Corresponding Member				
Roderick MacKinnon	Foreign Member				
Y. I. Manin	Foreign Member				
Basil Markesinis	Foreign Member				
Walter Melion	Foreign Member				
Julien Mendlewicz	Foreign Member				
Stephen Mennell	Foreign Member				
Hartmut Michel	Foreign Member				
Keith Moffatt	Foreign Member				
Joël Mokyr	Foreign Member				
Laurens Molenkamp	Foreign Member				
Mary Morgan	Foreign Member				
Gerhard Müller	Foreign Member				
