= Members of the Royal Netherlands Academy of Arts and Sciences (V) =

The Royal Netherlands Academy of Arts and Sciences (Dutch: Koninklijke Nederlandse Akademie van Wetenschappen, abbreviated: KNAW) is an organization dedicated to the advancement of science and literature in the Netherlands. The academy is housed in the Trippenhuis in Amsterdam. Founded in 1808, members are appointed for life by co-optation.

== List of members (V) ==
Name	Type	Division	Date of election	Notes	Ref.
Aad van der Vaart	Member				
Josef Vachek					
Johan Valckenaer					
Isaac Marinus Josué Valeton					
Josué Jean Philippe Valeton, Junior					
Théodéric Valeton					
M.H. van der Valk					
Patti Valkenburg	Member				
Samuel van Valkenburg					
Joka Vandenberg	Corresponding Member				
Jan Vandenbroucke	Member				
Sir John Robert Vane					
Áron Sandor Kibédi Varga					
Stamatis Vassiliadis					
Jacobus van der Vecht					
A.G. van Veen					
Friso van der Veen	Corresponding Member				
Hendrik van der Veen					
Peter van der Veer	Member				
Cock van de Velde	Member				
Henk te Velde	Member				
Jan Veldkamp					
Ilja Veldman	Member				
Haaye Veldstra					
Kees Vellekoop					
Martinus Veltman	Member				
A.J.H.M. (Ton) van de Ven			1985	Died 2014	
Joseph Jean Baptiste Marie Vendryes					
Felix Andries Vening Meinesz					
François Egide Verbeeck					
Peter-Paul Verbeek	Member				
Rogier Diederik Marius Verbeek					
Theo Verbeek	Member				
Henk Verbiest					
Gideon Jan Verdam					
Jacob Verdam					
Willem Jacob Verdenius					
Frans Verdoorn					
Pierre Emmanuel Verheyen					
Frans Rijndert Johan Verhoeven					
Jan Verhoeven	Member				
Johannes Josephus Herman Verhulst					
Adriaan E. Verhulst					
Feer Verkade	Member				
Pieter Eduard Verkade					
Arnold Willem Pieter Verkerk Pistorius					
Jacobus Dirk Verlinde					
M.C. Verloren van Themaat					
Pieter Verloren van Themaat					
Ben Vermeulen	Member				
Aug. Vermeylen					
H. Vernet					
Coenraad Alexander Verrijn Stuart					
Gerard Marius Verrijn Stuart					
Arnold Verruijt	Member				
Jan Versluys, Jzn					
Henk Versnel	Member				
Michiel Versteegh					
Dirk Versteegh					
Johan Gijsbert Verstolk van Soelen					
Jaap Verweij	Member				
Jan Verwey					
Evert Johannes Willem Verwey					
Eelco Verwijs					
Jan Hendrik Willem Verzijl					
Louise Vet	Member				
Pieter Johannes Veth					
Jan Pieter Veth					
E.N. Viborg					
H.N. Villenfagne d’Ingihout					
Charles François Dominique de Villers					
Hendrik Jan Vink					
Reinier Vinkeles					
Joannes Josephus Viotta					
R.L.K. Virchow					
Lodewijk Gerard Visscher					
Charles M.J.D. de Visscher					
Peter Visscher	Foreign Member				
Simon Vissering					
Gerard Vissering					
Albert Visser	Member				
Henk Visser	Member				
M.W. de Visser					
Marcel Visser	Member				
S.W. Visser					
Willem Adolf Visser 't Hooft					
N.J. (Nico) Vlaar					
John Hasbrouck van Vleck					
Sven Vleeming	Corresponding Member				
Isaäk Martinus van der Vlerk					
Hans Vliegenthart	Member				
Joannes van der Vliet					
Peter van der Vliet	Member				
Willem van der Vlugt					
Johann Heinrich Voet					
Hermann Carl Vogel					
J.Ph. Vogel					
Hermann Vogelsang					
Woldemar Voigt					
Pieter Jan de Volder, (1767-1841)					
Hendrik Cornelis Volger					
Cornelis van Vollenhoven					
Isbrandus Johannes Vollenhoven					
Carl Wilhelm Vollgraff					
Alessandro G.A.A. Volta					
Daniel Erhard Johannes Völter					
Rob van der Voo	Corresponding Member				
Hendrik Voogd					
Gustaaf Eduard Voorhelm Schneevoogt					
Petrus Voorhoeve					
Johannes van Voorst					
Cornelis Gerrit Nicolaas de Vooys					
Adolphe Guillaume Vorderman					
Pieter Otto Coenraad Vorsselman de Heer					
Henk van der Vorst	Member				
Jb. de Vos					
Jacob de Vos, Jbz					
Jacob de Vos, Willemsz					
Willem de Vos	Member				
Carel Vosmaer					
Gualtherus Carel Jacob Vosmaer					
Piek Vossen	Member				
Joan George Erardus Gijsbert Voûte					
Jean Pierre Etienne Voûte					
Jan Vranken	Member				
Jan Willem van Vredenburch, Junior					
George Willem Vreede					
Claes de Vreese	Member				
Quirin Vrehen	Member				
Abraham de Vries					
Benjamin de Vries	Corresponding Member				
Gerrit de Vries, Azn.					
Gerrit Jacob de Vries					
Jan de Vries	Foreign Member				
Jeronimo de Vries					
Matthias de Vries					
François de Vries					
Hans de Vries	Member				
Hessel de Vries					
Hendrik K. de Vries					
Hugo de Vries					
Jan P.M.L. de Vries					
Jan de Vries (1)					
Liesbeth de Vries	Member				
Willem Hendrik de Vriese					
Theodoor Christiaan Vriezen					
Gerardus Vrolijk					
Willem Vrolik					
Julius Johan Gerardus Vürtheim					
Detlef van Vuuren	Member				
