= Members of the Royal Netherlands Academy of Arts and Sciences (N) =

The Royal Netherlands Academy of Arts and Sciences (Dutch: Koninklijke Nederlandse Akademie van Wetenschappen, abbreviated: KNAW) is an organization dedicated to the advancement of science and literature in the Netherlands. The academy is housed in the Trippenhuis in Amsterdam. Founded in 1808, members are appointed for life by co-optation.

== List of members (N) ==
Name	Type	Division	Date of election	Notes	Ref.
Samuel Adrianus Naber	Member		1865		
Jean Charles Naber	Member		1906	Resigned in 1940. Re-admitted in 1945.	
Johann August Nahl			1809		
Johann August Nauck	Foreign Member		1885		
Charles P.T. Naudé	Corresponding Member		1971		
Bram Nauta	Member	Natural Sciences and Engineering	2017		
Lodi Nauta	Member	Humanities	2011		
Walle J.H. Nauta	Corresponding Member		1978		
François Joseph Navez			1826		
Jacques Neefjes	Member	Medical, Biomedical and Health Sciences	2015		
Louis Eugène Felix Néel	Foreign Member		1959		
Bernard Marie Karel Nefkens	Corresponding Member		1997		
John Nerbonne	Member	Humanities	2005		
Nancy Nersessian	Foreign Member	Behavioural Sciences, Social Sciences and Law	2006		
Mihai Netea	Member	Medical, Biomedical and Health Sciences	2016		
Herman Neubronner van der Tuuk	Corresponding Member		1868		
John von Neumann	Foreign Member		1950		
Walter Neupert	Foreign Member	Natural Sciences and Engineering	1999		
Simon Newcomb	Foreign Member		1898		
N.M.M. (Nico) Nibbering	Member		1988		
William Nicholson			1809		
Barthold Georg Niebuhr			1809		
Cornelis Bernardus van Niel	Corresponding Member		1950		
Bernard Nienhuis	Member	Natural Sciences and Engineering	2003		
Jan Frederik Niermeyer	Member		1962		
Hugo Frederik Nierstrasz	Member		1930		
Wiro Niessen	Member	Natural Sciences and Engineering	2017		
Bernardus Nieuhoff			1809		
A.W. Nieuwenhuis	Corresponding Member		1902	Resigned in 1904	
Jacob Hans Nieuwenhuis	Member		2005		
Lambertus Nieuwenhuis			1809		
Peter van Nieuwenhuizen	Corresponding Member	Natural Sciences and Engineering	1994		
Willem Nieuwenkamp	Member		1965		
E.H. Niggli	Foreign Member		1969		
Albert Nijenhuis	Corresponding Member		1966		
Emmie te Nijenhuis	Member	Humanities	1978		
Peter Nijkamp	Member	Behavioural Sciences, Social Sciences and Law	1987		
A.A. Nijland	Member		1923		
Johannes Aram Nodell			1809		
F.M. Noël			1809		
Th. Nöldeke	Foreign Member		1878		
Guust Nolet	Corresponding Member	Natural Sciences and Engineering	1996		
André Nollkaemper	Member	Behavioural Sciences, Social Sciences and Law	2012		
Roeland Nolte	Member	Natural Sciences and Engineering	2006		
Mrs. Hélène Nolthenius, sp/o Wagenaar	Member		1970	Became Foreign Member in 1978, re-admitted as regular member in 1981.	
Masayasu Nomura	Foreign Member		1989		
Ed Noort	Member	Humanities	1998		
Bart Nooteboom	Member	Behavioural Sciences, Social Sciences and Law	2000		
E. Nordenskiöld	Foreign Member		1932		
John D. North	Member		1985		
T.J. Northcote			1809		
Frits R. Noske	Member		1978		
G.R.F.M. Nuchelmans	Member		1975		
Alexander Numan			1827		
Hermanus Numan			1808		
Roel Nusse	Corresponding Member	Medical, Biomedical and Health Sciences	1997		
Is. An. Nyhoff			1828		
