= Members of the Royal Netherlands Academy of Arts and Sciences (K) =

The Royal Netherlands Academy of Arts and Sciences (Dutch: Koninklijke Nederlandse Akademie van Wetenschappen, abbreviated: KNAW) is an organization dedicated to the advancement of science and literature in the Netherlands. The academy is housed in the Trippenhuis in Amsterdam. Founded in 1808, members are appointed for life by co-optation.

== List of members (K) ==
Name	Type	Division	Date of election	Notes	Ref.
M. Kac					
W. Kaegi					
Friedrich Kaiser					
Jan Willem Kaiser					
J. Kalf					
G. Kalff					
J. Kamerbeek, jr.					
J.C. Kamerbeek					
Heike Kamerlingh Onnes					
Jacob van de Kamp					
P. van de Kamp					
N.G. van Kampen					
Nicolaas Godfried van Kampen					
D.M. (Daan) Kan					
A.H.M.J. van Kan					
Jacobus Kantelaar					
Johannes de Kanter, Philippusz.					
P.L. Kapitza					
Johannes Kappeyne van de Coppello					
Willem Kapteyn					
Jacob Cornelius Kapteyn					
K.B.J. Karlgren					
H.T. Karsten					
S. Karsten					
Pieter Leonard van de Kasteele					
P.W. Kasteleyn					
A.H.F. Kastler					
A.D.A. de Kat Angelino					
J.W. Kayser					
Willem Hendrik Keesom					
F.A. Kekulé von Stradonitz					
H. Kelsen					
G.Th. Kempe					
Joan Melchior Kemper					
Johannes Henricus Bernardus Kemperman					
P.J. van Kerckhoff					
G.A. van Kerkwijk					
Johan Hendrik Kern					
J.H.C. Kern					
G.W. Kernkamp					
Matthijs Kessels					
J.A.A. Ketelaar					
Robert Keuchenius Driessen					
Johan Frederik Keyser					
C. van de Kieft					
Raphael Georg Kiesewetter					
A.W. Kinder de Camarecq					
Johannes Kinker (1)					
Jan Hendrik van Kinsbergen					
G.R. Kirchhoff					
I. Kisch					
Nicolaas Christiaan Kist					
Jan Kistemaker					
Cornelis Jakob van der Klaauw					
E.N. van Kleffens					
A.P.H.A. de Kleijn					
P.W. Klein					
Felix C. Klein					
F.K.L. von Klenze					
Hendrik Harmen Klijn					
G.G. Kloeke					
Hendrik Douwe Kloosterman					
Joseph François Kluyskens					
Albert Kluyver					
Jan C. Kluyver					
Albert Jan Kluyver					
W.J. Knoop					
Jan Baptist Kobell					
A.C.F. Koch					
K.A.L. Kock					
B.C. Koekkoek					
Hendrik Jacob Koenen					
G.H.R. von Koeningswald					
F. Kögl					
J.H.F. Kohlbrugge					
W.T. Koiter					
Jurjen Ferdinand Koksma					
Willem Johan Kolff					
R.D. Kollewijn					
A.N. Kolmogorov					
I.M. Kolthoff					
J. Kommandeur					
R. König					
Jacobus Koning					
W.N. (Wil) Konings					
Jacob Christiaan Koningsberger					
V.J. Koningsberger					
Willem Bartel van der Kooi					
W. Koopman					
J.G. Koopmans					
Thijmen Koopmans					
T.C. Koopmans					
Rinse Klaasses Koopmans					
S.H. Koorders					
Theodorus van Kooten					
Jan Kops					
Diederik Johannes Korteweg					
Constantinus Albertus Josephus Maria Kortmann					
Nicolaas Willem Frederik Kossen					
E.H. Kossmann					
W.J.W. Koster					
Willem Koster					
W.H. Kosters					
J. Kosters					
W. Kouwenaar					
A.O. Kowalevsky					
H. Kraemer					
J.H. Kramers					
H. Kramers					
Hans A. Kramers					
Christiaan Kramm					
Jan van Kranendonk					
F.R. Kraus					
Johan Carl Krauss					
Cornelius Rudolphus Theodorus Krayenhoff					
G. Krediet					
W.B. Kristensen					
Ferdinand Anne Kröger					
N.J. Krom					
R. Kronig					
Cornelis Kruseman					
J.A. Kruseman					
Jan de Kruyff, jr.					
J.P. Kruyt					
A.C. Kruyt					
Hugo Rudolph Kruyt					
Johannes Petrus Kuenen					
A. Kuenen					
Ph.H. Kuenen					
D.J. Kuenen					
K. Kuiper					
F. B. J. Kuiper					
W.E.J. Kuiper					
Jan Willem Kuiper					
G.P. Kuiper					
Nicolaas Hendrik Kuiper					
A.H. Kuipers					
L.J.A. van der Kun					
J. Kunst					
Jacques Kuyper					
K. Kuypers					
Hans Kuypers					

=== Living members ===
Name	Type	Division	Date of election	Notes	Ref.
Dick van de Kaa	Member				
René Kahn	Member				
Matthijs Kalmijn	Member				
Ab van Kammen	Member				
Roland Kanaar	Member				
Rob Kaptein	Member				
Jos Kapteyn	Member				
Martijn Katan	Member				
Misha Katsnelson	Member				
Mike Keane	Member				
Jan Kiviet	Member				
Marian Klamer	Member				
Pauline Kleingeld	Member				
André Klip	Member				
Michiel van der Klis	Member				
Joost Kloek	Member				
Jan Willem Klop	Member				
Theo van de Klundert	Member				
Bert van der Knaap	Member				
Marjo van der Knaap	Member				
André Knottnerus	Member				
Jan Koeman	Member				
Jan Koenderink	Member				
Bas Kooijman	Member				
Jelle Koopmans	Member				
Marion Koopmans	Member				
Maarten Koornneef	Member				
Yvette van Kooyk	Member				
Marc Koper	Member				
Jaap Korevaar	Member				
Frits Kortlandt	Member				
Gerard van Koten	Member				
Leo Kouwenhoven	Member				
Xandra Kramer	Member				
Ben de Kruijff	Member				
Remke Kruk	Member				
Giselinde Kuipers	Member				
Hans Kuipers	Member				
Oscar Kuipers	Member				
Simon Kuipers	Member				
Max Kuperus	Member				
Hans Kamp	Corresponding Member	Humanities	1997		
Hans Kaper	Corresponding Member	Natural Sciences and Engineering	1989		
Ernestine Kaper	Corresponding Member	Medical, Biomedical and Health Sciences	1980		
Arie Kapteyn	Corresponding Member	Behavioural Sciences, Social Sciences and Law	2002		
Peter van Kessel	Corresponding Member	Humanities	1977		
Harry Kesten	Corresponding Member		1980		
Sol Kimel	Corresponding Member	Natural Sciences and Engineering	1989		
Hanan Kisch	Corresponding Member	Natural Sciences and Engineering	1989		
Johannes Konst	Corresponding Member	Humanities	2001		
Jan Kramers	Corresponding Member	Natural Sciences and Engineering	1998		
Dick Kroon	Corresponding Member	Natural Sciences and Engineering	2007		
Arno Kuijlaars	Corresponding Member	Natural Sciences and Engineering	2011		
Martin Karplus	Foreign Member	Natural Sciences and Engineering	1991		
Rudolf Kassel	Foreign Member	Humanities	1991		
Edward Kenney	Foreign Member	Humanities	1976		
Chryssa Kouveliotou	Foreign Member	Natural Sciences and Engineering	2015		
Leonard van der Kuijp	Foreign Member	Humanities	2018		
Srinivas Kulkarni	Foreign Member	Natural Sciences and Engineering	2016		
