= Portrait of the Trip Sisters =

Painting by Ferdinand Bol

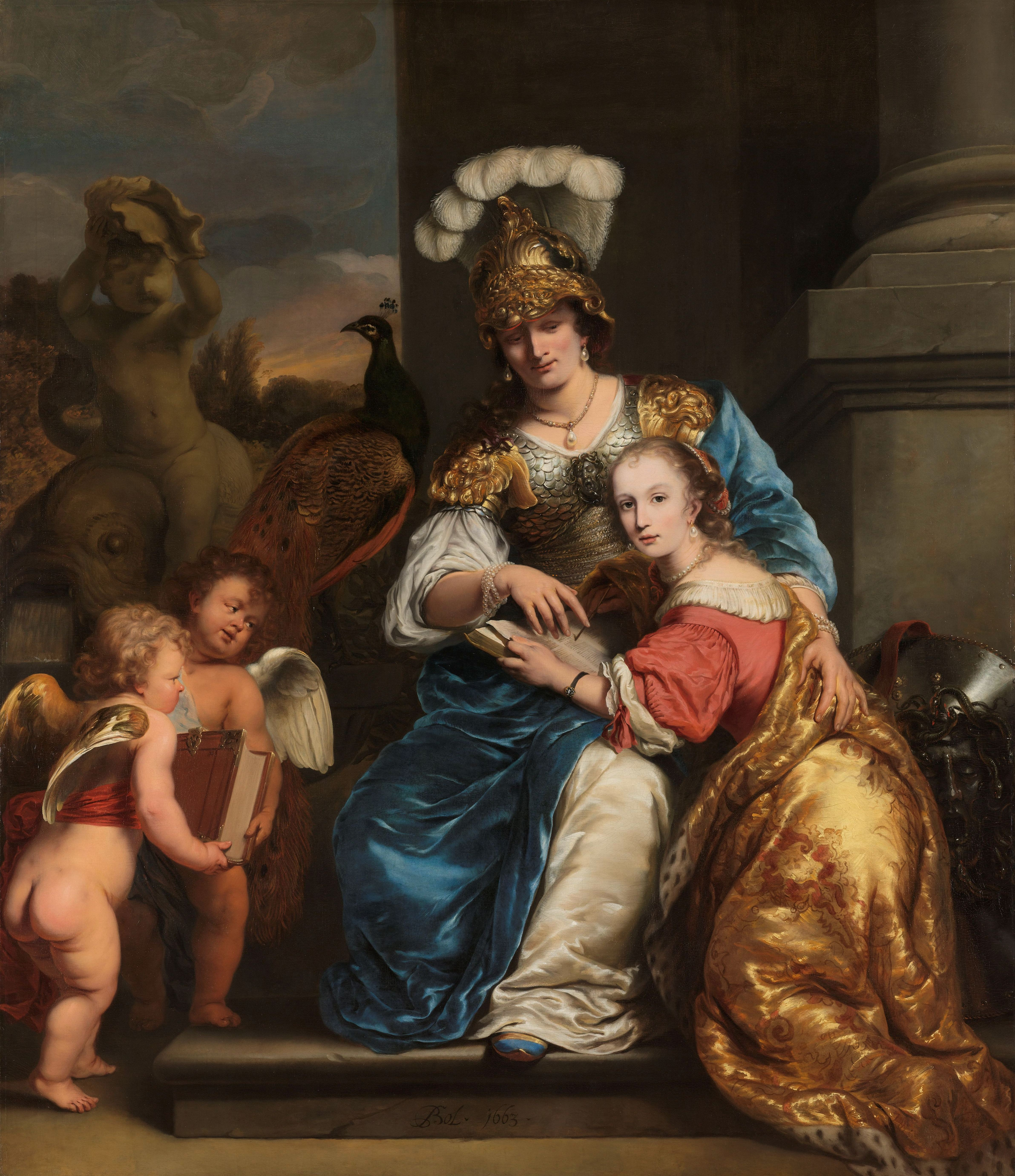
- Artist: Ferdinand Bol
- Year: 1663
- Medium: Oil on canvas
- Dimensions: 208 cm × 179 cm (82 in × 70 in)
- Location: Rijksmuseum; Amsterdam

Portrait of the Trip Sisters, also known as Portrait of Margarita Trip as Minerva Teaching Her Sister Anna Maria Trip, is an oil on canvas painting by Dutch artist Ferdinand Bol, created in 1663. It is in the collection of the Rijksmuseum, in Amsterdam, but is currently displayed at the Royal Netherlands Academy of Arts and Sciences, also in Amsterdam. It is signed and dated 'fBol 1663'.

== History and description ==
It shows Margarita Trip (1640–1714) and her sister Anna Maria Trip (1652–1681), both daughters of the merchant Louis Trip and his wife Emerentia Hoefslager. Trip also commissioned the imposing Trippenhuis, over two of whose fireplaces this painting and Portrait of Johanna de Geer and her Children as Charity originally hung. On the left two putti carry a large book, possibly in an allusion to the love of knowledge. In the background there is see a balustrade with a park-like area behind, and a fountain in the shape of a putto (or Cupid) on a dolphin. This motif comes from Roman art. There is also a peacock on the balustrade. On the far right against a wall is the shield of Minerva with the head of Medusa on top.

The painter Ferdinand Bol painted a second mantel piece for this house, the Portrait of Johanna de Geer and her Children as Charity, which, just like the portrait of Margarita Trip also has an allegorical meaning. A painting in which the sitter is depicted in, for example, a mythological role is referred to by the term portrait historié. Such portraits were more common in the 17th century.

== Provenance ==
It originally hung in the corner room on the first floor of the Trippenhuis's southern wing - Hendrik Trip occupied the north wing The Rijksmuseum was housed in the Trippenhuis from 1816 to 1885 and the main hall was divided into two in 1858 to place Rembrandt's The Night Watch and Bartholomeus van der Helst's Meal of the Schutters opposite each other, which may have been the occasion when both the chimney-piece works were added to the Rijksmuseum collection.

== Bibliography (in Dutch) ==
- Anoniem (1903) Catalogus der Schilderijen miniaturen, pastels, omlijste teekeningen, enz. in het Rijks-Museum te Amsterdam, Amsterdam: Boek- en kunstdrukkerij v/h Roeloffzen-Hübner en Van Santen, p. 54, cat.nr. 546 (als Het Onderwijs). Zie archive.org.
- Anoniem (1934) Catalogus der schilderijen pastels–miniaturen–aquarellen tentoongesteld in het Rijksmuseum te Amsterdam, Amsterdam: J.H. de Bussy, p. 53, cat.nr. 546 (als Het Onderwijs). Zie delpher.nl.
- Dyserinck, Johs. (1891) 'De schuttersmaaltijd van Bartholomeus van der Helst', De Gids, jrg. 55, p. 381-430. Zie dbnl.org.

== Exhibition History ==
- Kinderen op hun mooist. Het kinderportret in de Nederlanden 1500-1700, Frans Halsmuseum, Haarlem, 7 October-31 December 2000, ISBN 9076588120.
- Holländsk guldålder. Rembrandt, Frans Hals och deras samtida, Nationalmuseum, Stockholm, 22 September 2005 – 8 January 2006, ISBN 917100730X.
- Rembrandt? The Master and his Workshop, Statens Museum for Kunst, Kopenhagen, 4 February-14 May 2006, ISBN 978-8790096519.
