= Members of the Royal Netherlands Academy of Arts and Sciences (P) =

The Royal Netherlands Academy of Arts and Sciences (Dutch: Koninklijke Nederlandse Akademie van Wetenschappen, abbreviated: KNAW) is an organization dedicated to the advancement of science and literature in the Netherlands. The academy is housed in the Trippenhuis in Amsterdam. Founded in 1808, members are appointed for life by co-optation.

== List of members (P) ==
Name	Type	Division	Date of election	Notes	Ref.
Anton Herman Reinier Everhard Paap					
Rudolf Willem Jacob Baron van Pabst tot Bingerden					
Joseph Paelinck					
Adriaan Paets van Troostwijk					
Abraham Pais					
Peter Simon Pallas					
Johannes Henricus van der Palm					
Jan Pan					
Anton Pannekoek					
Erwin Panofsky					
Jean Marie Pardessus					
Jean Henri Pareau					
Gaston Bruno Paulin Paris					
Joseph Julien Ghislain Parmentier					
Georg Friedrich Parrot					
Louis Pasteur					
Wolfgang Ernst Pauli					
Ivan Petrovich Pavlow					
Holger Pedersen					
C.J.A.C. Peeters					
Cornelis Adrianus Pekelharing					
Bert Peletier	Member		1999		
Paul Pelliot					
Jan Pen					
Charles Percier					
Hubert Pernot					
Georg Heinrich Pertz					
Max Ferdinand Perutz					
Pieter Willem Pestman					
Sir Rudolph Peters					
Raffaele Pettazzoni					
Max Josef von Pettenkofer					
Eduard Friedrich Wilhelm Pflüger					
C.L. (Lennart) Philipson					
Charles Picard					
Jan Willem Pieneman					
Nicolaas Pieneman					
Nicolaas Gerard Pierson					
Allard Pierson (2)					
Jacobus Pierson Tholen					
Theodor Gauthier Thomas Pigeaud					
Arthur Cecil Pigou					
Leendert van der Pijl					
Adrianus Pijper					
Guillaume Frédéric Pijper					
Jan Carel Pilaar					
Aaron Adolf de Pinto					
Henri Pirenne					
Jean Baptiste Pisson					
Thomas Place					
Max Karl Ernst Ludwig Planck					
Charles-Henri Plantade					
Joseph Antoine Ferdinand Plateau					
Helmuth Karl Otto Gustav Bernhard Plessner					
Willem Pleyte					
Johannes Petrus Maria (Jan) van der Ploeg					
Detlev W. Ploog					
Daniël Plooij					
Willem George Pluygers					
Jan Josephus Poelhekke					
Jules Henri Poincaré					
Balthasar van der Pol					
Jacques Polak					
Herman Josef Polak					
Dirk Polder					
Albert Policard					
Josef Vincent Polišenský					
Jiří Polívka					
P. Polman, O.F.M.					
Hans Jakob Polotsky					
Meinardus Siderius Pols					
Jean Joseph Marie Vincent Pommier					
Willem Petrus Joseph Pompe					
Jan Popken					
L.G. Portman					
Hendrik Josephus Pos					
Regnerus Richardus Post					
Nicolaas Wilhelmus Posthumus					
Oene Posthumus					
Guillaume Henri Marie Posthumus Meyjes					
Henk Postma					
Combertus Willem van der Pot					
Marie Charles Joseph de Pougens					
Francois Charles Hugues Laurent Pouqueville					
Joseph Basile Bernard van Praet, (1754-1837)					
Mrs. Claire Préaux					
Jacob (Jacques) Presser					
Konrad Theodor Preuss					
Joseph Jules Guillaume Prick					
Sir John William Sutton Pringle					
Willem Frederik Prins					
Jan Albert Prins					
Hendrik Coenraad Prinsen Geerligs					
Charles François Ferdinand le Prud'homme d'Hailly, Vicomte de Nieuport					
Cornelis Pruys van der Hoeven					

=== Living members ===
Name	Type	Division	Date of election	Notes	Ref.
Thom Palstra	Member				
Brenda Penninx	Member				
Theunis Piersma	Member				
Corné Pieterse	Member				
Bob Pinedo	Member				
Patricia Pisters	Member				
Ronald Plasterk	Member				
Henri Pleket	Member				
Hans van der Plicht	Member				
Ibo van de Poel	Member				
Willem van der Poel	Member				
Tom van der Poll	Member				
Judith Pollmann	Member				
Albert Polman	Member				
Bert Poolman	Member				
Danielle Posthuma	Member				
Dirkje Postma	Member				
Bernard van Praag	Member				
Mirjam van Praag	Member				
Herman van Praag	Member				
Maarten Prak	Member				
Lucas Prakke	Member				
Sacha Prechal	Member				
Corien Prins	Member				
Wim van der Putten	Member				
René Pahud de Mortanges	Corresponding Member	Behavioural Sciences, Social Sciences and Law	1997		
Johannes Pennings	Corresponding Member	Behavioural Sciences, Social Sciences and Law	1995		
Jean Pieters	Corresponding Member	Medical, Biomedical and Health Sciences	2011		
Rick van der Ploeg	Corresponding Member	Behavioural Sciences, Social Sciences and Law	2010		
Hidde Ploegh	Corresponding Member	Medical, Biomedical and Health Sciences	1997		
Jacques Poot	Corresponding Member	Behavioural Sciences, Social Sciences and Law	2002		
Roel Prins	Corresponding Member	Natural Sciences and Engineering	1988		
Franz Palm	Foreign Member	Behavioural Sciences, Social Sciences and Law	2000		
Geoffrey Parker	Foreign Member	Humanities	2005		
B. H. Partee	Foreign Member	Humanities	2002		
Kiran Patel	Foreign Member	Humanities	2019		
Peter Pearson	Foreign Member	Medical, Biomedical and Health Sciences	1992		
David Pinder	Foreign Member	Behavioural Sciences, Social Sciences and Law	2003		
Om Prakash	Foreign Member	Humanities	2000		
Walter Prevenier	Foreign Member	Humanities	1996		
Sally Price	Foreign Member	Behavioural Sciences, Social Sciences and Law	2000		
Andrea Prosperetti	Foreign Member	Natural Sciences and Engineering	2000		
