= Members of the Royal Netherlands Academy of Arts and Sciences (O) =

The Royal Netherlands Academy of Arts and Sciences (Dutch: Koninklijke Nederlandse Akademie van Wetenschappen, abbreviated: KNAW) is an organization dedicated to the advancement of science and literature in the Netherlands. The academy is housed in the Trippenhuis in Amsterdam. Founded in 1808, members are appointed for life by co-optation.

== List of members (O) ==
Name	Type	Division	Date of election	Notes	Ref.
Heiko Augustinus Oberman	Corresponding Member		1963		
Joseph-Denis Odevaere			1816		
Theo Odijk	Member	Natural Sciences and Engineering	2008		
Hans Oerlemans	Member	Natural Sciences and Engineering	1994		
Johannes Offerhaus	Member		1957		
Werner Ogris					
Heinrich Wilhelm Matthias Olbers			1809		
Hermann Oldenberg	Foreign Member		1919		
Axel Olrik	Foreign Member		1914		
Jean-Baptiste-Julien d' Omalius d’Halloy			1816		
Balthazar Paulus Ommeganck			1816		
Conrad Gerard Ontijd			1809		
Louis Onvlee	Corresponding Member		1952	Resigned in 1956.	
Willem Johan van der Oord	Corresponding member		1969		
Jan Willem Louis van Oordt			1855		
Jan Hendrik Oort	Member		1937	Resigned in 1943, re-admitted in 1945.	
Arend Joan Petrus Oort	Member		1958		
John van der Oost	Member	Natural Sciences and Engineering	2017		
Luitzen Johannes Oosterhoff	Member		1963		
Frits van Oostrom	Member	Humanities	1994		
Eric Opdam	Member	Natural Sciences and Engineering	2012		
Jacques Oppenheim	Member		1902		
Hans Opschoor	Member	Behavioural Sciences, Social Sciences and Law	1994		
Cornelis Willem Opzoomer	Member		1856		
Gerrit van Orden			1821		
Johann Caspar von Orelli			1832		
Gordon Orians	Foreign Member	Natural Sciences and Engineering	1983		
L.S. Ornstein	Member		1929		
Michel Orrit	Member	Natural Sciences and Engineering	2018		
Jhr. Jacob Reinoud Theodoor Ortt			1870		
Henk van Os	Member	Humanities	1989		
Jim van Os	Member	Medical, Biomedical and Health Sciences	2011		
Pieter Gerardus van Os			1820		
Jan Osse	Member	Natural Sciences and Engineering	1994		
Frederik Daniel Eduard van Ossenbruggen			1916		
Ab Osterhaus	Member	Medical, Biomedical and Health Sciences	2001		
Jeremiah Ostriker	Foreign Member	Natural Sciences and Engineering	1999		
Friedrich Wilhelm Ostwald	Foreign Member		1904		
Louis Otten	Corresponding Member		1934		
Koen Ottenheym	Member	Humanities	2010		
Sijbren Otto	Member	Natural Sciences and Engineering	2020		
Corneille Antoine Jean Abram Oudemans	Member		1858		
Antonie Corneille Oudemans, Junior	Member		1869		
Jean Abraham Chrétien Oudemans	Member		1855		
Alexander van Oudenaarden	Member	Medical, Biomedical and Health Sciences	2014		
Adrianus Jacob François Oudendal	Corresponding Member		1926	Resigned in 1930.	
Sir William G. Ouseley of Crickhowell			1815		
Julius Christiaan van Oven	Member		1948		
Jan Theodoor Gerard Overbeek	Member		1953		
Hermen Overkleeft	Member	Natural Sciences and Engineering	2018		
Richard Owen			1844		
Hendrik van Oyen	Foreign Member		1956		
