= Members of the Royal Netherlands Academy of Arts and Sciences (I) =

The Royal Netherlands Academy of Arts and Sciences (Dutch: Koninklijke Nederlandse Akademie van Wetenschappen, abbreviated: KNAW) is an organization dedicated to the advancement of science and literature in the Netherlands. The academy is housed in the Trippenhuis in Amsterdam. Founded in 1808, members are appointed for life by co-optation.

== List of members (I) ==
Name	Type	Division	Date of election	Notes	Ref.
Francesco Iachello	Foreign Member	Natural Sciences and Engineering	1996	Physicist.	
Wilt Idema	Member	Humanities	1999	Scholar of Chinese literature.	
Marinus van IJzendoorn	Member	Behavioural Sciences, Social Sciences and Law	1998	Scholar of human development.	
J.W. IJzerman	Corresponding Member	Literature	23 April 1886	Resigned 14 December 1896. Died 10 October 1932. Military engineer.	
Guido Imbens	Foreign Member	Behavioural Sciences, Social Sciences and Law	2017	Economist.	
F. Imhoof Blumer (de)	Foreign Member	Literature	28 April 1883	Died 26 April 1920. Numismatist.	
Ferdinand van Ingen	Member	Humanities	1978	Classicist.	
Jonathan Israel	Foreign Member	Humanities	1994	Historian.	
G. van Iterson	Member	Physics	10 May 1918	Died 4 January 1972. Botanist.	
Frederik Karel Theodoor van Iterson	Member	Physics	19 May 1934	Died 11 December 1957. Engineer.	
A.F. van Itterbeek	Foreign Member	Physics	22 May 1953	Died 28 April 1968. Physicist.	
