= Members of the Royal Netherlands Academy of Arts and Sciences (Z) =

The Royal Netherlands Academy of Arts and Sciences (Dutch: Koninklijke Nederlandse Akademie van Wetenschappen, abbreviated: KNAW) is an organization dedicated to the advancement of science and literature in the Netherlands. The academy is housed in the Trippenhuis in Amsterdam. Founded in 1808, members are appointed for life by co-optation.

== List of members (Z) ==
Name	Type	Division	Date elected	Notes	Reference
Teunis Zaaijer	Member	Physics	4 May 1874	Died 23 December 1902.	
Adriaan Cornelis Zaanen	Member	Physics	5 June 1950	Resigned 16 October 1950. Re-elected 20 May 1960. Died 2003	
Jan Zaanen					
James Zachos	Foreign Member				
Don Zagier	Foreign Member				
Waldo Heliodoor Zagwijn					
Johann Christian M. Zahn	Corresponding Member	–	27 April 1809	Died 25 May 1818.	
Pieter Jacobus Zandbergen					
Jan Luiten van Zanden					
Herman Zanstra	Member	Physics	17 June 1949	Died 2 October 1972.	
Johannes Zeeman	Member	Physics	11 May 1872	Died 21 November 1905.	
Pieter Zeeman	Member	Physics	13 May 1898	Died 9 October 1943.	
Chris de Zeeuw					
Tim de Zeeuw					
Jan Adriaan Dingenis Zeevaart	Corresponding Member	Physics	6 April 1974	Died 25 November 2009.	
Sascha Zehnder					
Willem van Zeist					
Yi Zeng	Foreign Member				
F. Zernike	Member	Physics	12 June 1946	Died 10 March 1966.	
Bernard George Ziedses des Plantes	Member	Physics	25 May 1955	Died 21 July 1993.	
P. A. (Peter) Ziegler	Foreign Member	Physics	1984	Died 19 July 2013.	
Bartholomeus Wilhelmus Henricus Ziesenis	Member	–	18 July 1808	Died 1 May 1820.	
Kitty Zijlmans					
Jenne Johan Zijlstra	Member	Physics	26 April 1982	Died 2 August 1989.	
Willem Gerrit Zijlstra					
Jelle Zijlstra	Member	Literature	5 June 1973	Died 23 December 2001.	
Reinhard Zimmermann	Foreign Member				
Jan David Zocher	Member	–	28 November 1835	Resigned 26 October 1851. Died 8 July 1870.	
Petrus Josephus Zoetmulder, SJ	Corresponding Member	Literature	5 June 1948	Died 8 July 1995	
Peter Zoller	Foreign Member				
P. J. Zuidema	Corresponding Member	Physics	18 May 1956	Resigned 1 January 1958. Died 1996.	
R. Tom Zuidema	Corresponding Member		1977	Died 2 March 2016.	
Klaus-Joachim Zülch	Foreign Member	Physics	20 June 1978	Died 2 December 1988	
Paul J. Zumthor	Foreign Member	Literature	1 March 1971	Died 11 January 1995	
Erik Zürcher	Member	Literature	20 May 1975	Died 7 February 2008	
Erik-Jan Zürcher					
Hendrik Zwaardemaker	Member	Physics	11 May 1903	Died 19 September 1930	
H. J. (Henk) Zwart	Member	Physics	5 June 1973	Died 18 November 2012	
Willem Zwalve					
Frans Zwarts					
Albert Zwaveling					
Jaap Zwemmer					
Willem van Zwet					
A. E. van Zwolle	Member	Literature	6 May 1932	Died 31 May 1973	
