= Members of the Royal Netherlands Academy of Arts and Sciences (R) =

The Royal Netherlands Academy of Arts and Sciences (Dutch: Koninklijke Nederlandse Akademie van Wetenschappen, abbreviated: KNAW) is an organization dedicated to the advancement of science and literature in the Netherlands. The academy is housed in the Trippenhuis in Amsterdam. Founded in 1808, members are appointed for life by co-optation.

== List of members (R) ==
Name	Type	Division	Date of election	Notes	Ref.
Maurits Henri van Raalte					
Alfred Reginald Radcliffe-Brown					
Gijsbertus Godefriedus Johannes Rademaker					
Sijbrand Radelaar					
Wietse Radsma					
Stefan Lorenz Radt					
Jean Joseph Raepsaet					
Carl Christian Rafn					
Santiago Ramón y Cajal					
Sir William Ramsay					
Alexandros Rizos Rangavis					
Leopold von Ranke					
Willem Huibert Rassers					
Gerhart Wolfgang (Gerd) Rathenau					
Sebald Jean Everard Rau					
Christian Daniel Rauch					
Johann Georg Rauppe					
Nicolaas Wilhem Pieter Rauwenhoff					
Christiaan Pieter Raven					
Sir Henry Creswicke Rawlinson					
Comelis Reedijk					
Jacob Hendrik van Reenen					
Richard (Rijk) van Rees					
Otto van Rees					
Hendrik Eduard Reeser					
Ignatius Josephus van Regemorter					
Henri Victor Regnault					
W.E. Reichardt					
J.F. Reichardt					
A.J.B.N. Reichling					
Z. Reijers					
S. Reinach					
Geert Reinders					
Caspar Georg Carel Reinwardt					
Z. Reiss					
J. Remmelink					
Jean-Pierre Abel Remusat					
G.J. Renier					
L.M.J. Renou					
J.W. Retgers					
Casper Jacob Christiaan Reuvens					
Albert Réville					
Cornelis Wilhelmus de Rhoer					
G.F.C.M. de Riche de Prony					
P. Ricoeur					
J. Ridder					
jhr. Adriaan Daniël van Riemsdijk					
Th.H.F. van Riemsdijk					
Mrs. Simone M. van Riet					
P. (Piet) Rietveld					
Julius Constantijn Rijk					
Lambertus Marie ('Bertus') de Rijk					
Petrus Leonardus Rijke					
G.A. van Rijnberk					
Leendert Rijsterborgh					
H. Rinia					
G. Ripert					
A.R. Ritsema					
K. Ritter					
J.F. Röchlitz					
L.J.A. Roelandt					
J. Roëll					
Willem Frederik Roëll					
W.P. de Roever					
H.C. Rogge					
L.J. Rogier					
J.C. Röhner					
Pieter van Romburgh					
Ph.S. van Ronkel					
G.M. Röntgen					
W.C. Röntgen					
Johannes Joseph van Rood					
Taco Roorda					
F. de Roos					
Cornelis Sebille Roos					
A.G. Roos					
Gijsbertus Johannes Rooyens					
William Roscoe					
H.J. Rose					
Willem Nicolaas Rose					
Baron Victor Romanowich von Rosen					
Emil Waldemar Rosenberg					
Giovanni Battista (Carlo) de Rossi					
Johan Theodorus Rossijn					
Michael Ivanovitch Rostovtzeff					
Dignus Willem Rost van Tonningen					
François Antoine Roucel					
François Roucel					
Joseph Emmanuel Ghislain Roulez					
Jaques Adolph Charles Rovers					
Herbert H. Rowen					
Cornelis Henricus à Roy					
Herman Johan Royaards					
Henricus van Royen					
Gerlach P. Royen					
Louis Royer					
Adolf Stephanus Rueb					
Cornelis Jord Ruijgh					
Henricus Cornelis Rümke					
Stanley Keith Runcorn					
Christian Friedrich Ruppe					
Adolf Johann Cord Rüter					
Arend Joan Rutgers					
Antonius Rutgers					
Abraham Arnold Lodewijk Rutgers					
1st Baron Rutherford of Nelson Rutherford, Ernest					
L. Rutten					
Leopold Stephan Ruzicka					
Gonzague Ryckmans					

=== Living members ===
Name	Type	Division	Date of election	Notes	Ref.
Rudy Rabbinge	Member				
Theo Rasing	Member				
Jan Reedijk	Member				
Joost Reek	Member				
Hans Reiber	Member				
David Reinhoudt	Member				
Rob Reneman	Member				
Richard Ridderinkhof	Member				
Ivonne Rietjens	Member				
Ann Rigney	Member				
Maarten de Rijke	Member				
Ingrid Robeyns	Member				
George Robillard	Member				
Wil Roebroeks	Member				
Karin Roelofs	Member				
Frits Rosendaal	Member				
Joost Ruitenberg	Member				
Reiner Rummel	Member				
W. G. J. Remmelink	Corresponding Member				
Geert Ridder	Corresponding Member				
René de la Rie	Corresponding Member				
Avraham Rinat-Reiner	Corresponding Member				
Eelco Rohling	Corresponding Member				
Nico de Rooij	Corresponding Member				
Douwe Runia	Corresponding Member				
Martin Rees	Foreign Member				
Manfred Reetz	Foreign Member				
David Regan	Foreign Member				
Lucas van Rompay	Foreign Member				
Hilger Ropers	Foreign Member				
