= Eddy van der Maarel =

Dutch ecologist and writer (1934–2021)

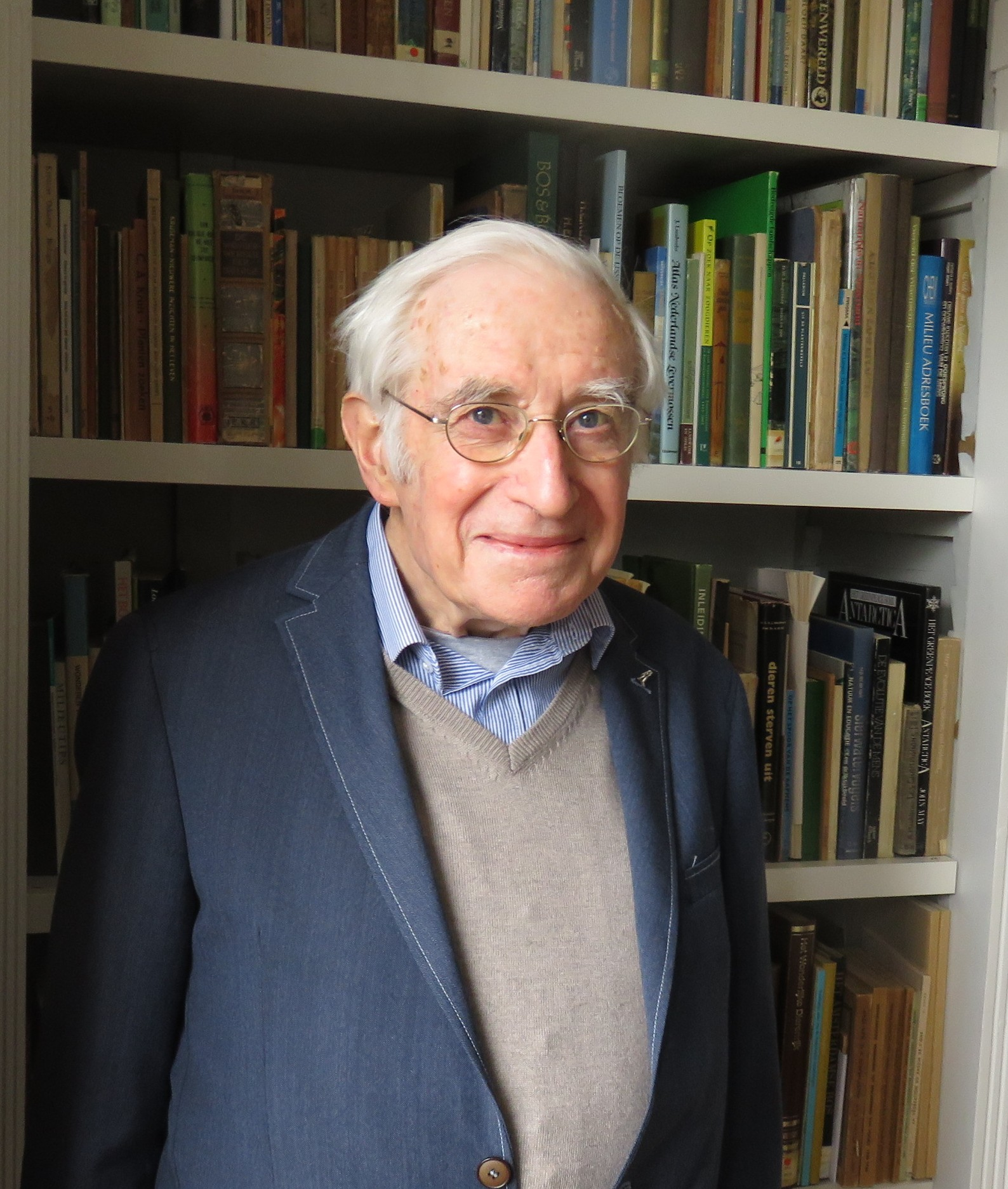
Eddy van der Maarel, 2016

Evert "Eddy" van der Maarel (23 February 1934 – 4 April 2021) was a Dutch ecologist. He spent most of his career as professor of ecological botany at Uppsala University in Sweden.

== Career ==
Van der Maarel was born on 23 February 1934 in Amsterdam. He studied biology at the University of Amsterdam between 1951 and 1959. Between 1962 and 1968 he worked at the institute of botany of Utrecht University and later at the institute of plant ecology of the University of Groningen. Van der Maarel obtained his PhD at Utrecht University in 1966 with a dissertation titled : "Over vegetatiestructuren, -relaties en -systemen in het bijzonder in de duingraslanden van Voorne". Between 1968 and 1981 he was a lecturer of geobotany at the Catholic University Nijmegen. From 1981 to 1999 van de Maarel was a professor of ecological botany at Uppsala University. From 1995 to 1999 he was the Gerard Baerends professor at the University of Groningen. He retired in 1999. He died on 4 April 2021.

He was the founder of the Journal of Vegetation Science and Applied Vegetation Science.

== Honours and awards ==
Van der Maarel was elected a corresponding member of the Royal Netherlands Academy of Arts and Sciences in 1986. He became a fellow of the Royal Physiographic Society in Lund in 1991.

He was elected a foreign member of the Royal Swedish Academy of Sciences in the group of biosciences and was an Honorary Member of the International Association for Vegetation Science.

== Personal life ==
Text: Van der Maarel was married to Marijke van der Maarel; they had three children: Marius, Joost, and Annette.
