= Members of the Royal Netherlands Academy of Arts and Sciences (T) =

The Royal Netherlands Academy of Arts and Sciences (Dutch: Koninklijke Nederlandse Akademie van Wetenschappen, abbreviated: KNAW) is an organization dedicated to the advancement of science and literature in the Netherlands. The academy is housed in the Trippenhuis in Amsterdam. Founded in 1808, members are appointed for life by co-optation.

== List of members (T) ==
Name	Type	Division	Date of election	Notes	Ref.
Krijn Wijbren Taconis					
Floris Takens					
Pieter Merkus Lambertus ('Bruin') Tammes					
Arnold Jan Pieter Tammes					
Sir William Woodthorpe Tarn					
Alfred Tarski					
André Benoït Barrau Taurel					
Sir Geoffrey Ingram Taylor					
A. ('Hans') Teeuw					
Josué Teissèdre l'Ange					
Bernardus Dominicus Hubertus (II) Tellegen					
Bernardus Dominicus Hubertus (I) Tellegen					
Coenraad Jacob Temminck					
Nanny Ph. Tendeloo					
Martinus Gerardus Tetar van Elven					
Frederik van Teutem					
Emile den Tex					
Cornelis Anne den Tex					
Johannes Elias Teysmann					
Albrecht Daniel Thaer					
Henri Theil					
A. Theiner					
Jean Thomas Thibault					
J.H. Thiel					
A.C. Thienon					
Johannes Theodoor Thijsse					
Henricus Franciscus Thijssen					
Bonno Thoden van Velzen	Member	Humanities	1990		
Hendrik Bernardus Thom					
Evert Jan Thomassen à Thuessink					
Vilhelm Ludwig Peter Thomsen					
Sir Joseph John Thomson					
William Thomson, 1st Baron Kelvin					
Johan Rudolph Thorbecke					
Geertruida Jeanette Thorbecke					
Bertel Thorwaldsen					
Carl Peter Thunberg					
Bruno Johannes Tideman					
Friedrich Tiedemann					
Cornelis Petrus Tiele					
Robert Adolf Armand Tigerstedt					
Hendrik Wouter van Tijen					
Reinier Timman					
Niko Tinbergen					
Jan Tinbergen					
F.F. Tisserand					
T.S. Tjan					
John Alexander Tjon Joe Gin					
Masanao Toda					
E.H. Toelcken					
Hendrik Franciscus Tollens, Carolusz					
Hermannius Tollius					
H.J. Toxopeus					
N.J. Trappeniers					
V. Trausch					
A.D. Trendall					
Melchior Treub					
G.M. Trevelyan					
Anne Sjerp Troelstra					
S.P.C. Tromp					
S.W. Tromp					
Wouter Johannes van Troostwijk					
N.S. Trubetzkoy					
A.R. Tunc					
L.H. van der Tweel					
Hendrik Willem Tydeman					
Meinard Tydeman					

=== Living members ===
Name	Type	Division	Date of election	Notes	Ref.
Andrew Tanenbaum	Member	Natural Sciences and Engineering	1994		
Ed Taverne	Member	Humanities	1999		
Kees Teer	Member	Natural Sciences and Engineering	1977		
Barbara Terhal	Member	Natural Sciences and Engineering	2020		
Peter Teunissen	Member	Natural Sciences and Engineering	2000		
Jan Theeuwes	Member	Behavioural Sciences, Social Sciences and Law	2010		
Jacques Thomassen	Member	Behavioural Sciences, Social Sciences and Law	1996		
Ingrid Tieken-Boon van Ostade	Member	Humanities	2014		
Xander Tielens	Member	Natural Sciences and Engineering	2012		
Rob Tijdeman	Member	Natural Sciences and Engineering	1987		
Vino Timmerman	Member	Behavioural Sciences, Social Sciences and Law	2001		
Jacques Touret	Member	Natural Sciences and Engineering	1988		
Jeannot Trampert	Member	Natural Sciences and Engineering	2018		
Guido Tytgat	Member	Medical, Biomedical and Health Sciences	1988		
Pieter Paulus Tans	Corresponding Member	Natural Sciences and Engineering	1995		
Christiaan Timmermans	Corresponding Member	Behavioural Sciences, Social Sciences and Law	1991		
Jeroen Tromp	Corresponding Member	Natural Sciences and Engineering	2007		
Jacques Tits	Foreign Member	Natural Sciences and Engineering	1988		
Jo Tollebeek	Foreign Member	Humanities	2009		
Bill Trowbridge	Foreign Member	Natural Sciences and Engineering	1992		
Viggo Tvergaard	Foreign Member	Natural Sciences and Engineering	1999		
