= Members of the Royal Netherlands Academy of Arts and Sciences (C) =

The Royal Netherlands Academy of Arts and Sciences (Dutch: Koninklijke Nederlandse Akademie van Wetenschappen, abbreviated: KNAW) is an organization dedicated to the advancement of science and literature in the Netherlands. The academy is housed in the Trippenhuis in Amsterdam. Founded in 1808, members are appointed for life by co-optation.

== List of members (C) ==
Name	Type	Division	Date of election	Notes	Ref.
R. C. van Caenegem	Foreign Member				
L. Caetani, Duke of Sermoneta					
A. Calame					
Willem Caland					
Jean-Robert Calloigne					
MeIvin Calvin					
M.F.A.G. Campbell					
Adriaan Gilles Camper					
Augustin Pyramus de Candolle					
A.P. de Candolle					
A. Canova					
Hans Capel	Member				
J.J. Canter Cremers					
Johan Pieter van Cappelle					
Jacob Cardinaal					
Antoine Alexandre Joseph Cardon					
Peter Carmeliet	Foreign Member				
Élie J. Cartan					
P. Cartellier					
D. Carutti di Cantogno					
Hendrik Brugt Gerhard Casimir					
J.G. de Casparis					
A. Cayley					
U.W.T. Cazius					
C. Cels					
F.J. Chabas					
J. Chadwick					
Ger Challa	Member				
J.J. Champollion					
Jean-François Champollion					
Pierre Daniel Chantepie de la Saussaye					
P.J.B. Chaussard					
Lisa Cheng	Member				
Marie Louis Charles Zenobie Salvator Cherubini					
M. Chevalier					
Jacobus Anne van der Chijs					
A. Choron					
L.A. Claessens					
Johannes Clarisse					
Eve Clark	Foreign Member				
Sir George Norman Clark					
Herbert Clark	Foreign Member				
Sir John Grahame Douglas Clark					
R.J.E. Clausius					
A.J.T.A. Clavareau					
Jacob Clay					
Willem de Clercq					
Rudolph Pabus Cleveringa					
Rudolph Pabus Cleveringa, Pzn					
Hans Clevers	Member				
Jean Arnoud Clignett					
Sierd Cloetingh	Member				
Michael George Clyne					
C.G. Cobet					
George Coedès					
Reinder Coehoorn	Member				
Frans Camille Cornelis van Coetsem					
Ernst Julius Cohen					
Ezechiël Godert David Cohen					
Hans Cohen	Member				
J.A. Cohen					
A.B. Cohen Stuart					
Lewis Cohen Stuart					
Martien Cohen Stuart	Member				
H.T. Colenbrander					
Hendrik Collet d'Escury					
Margaret Collinson	Foreign Member				
A.H. (Arthur) Compton					
Bernard Comrie	Foreign Member				
G. Conestabile della Staffa					
S.M. Coninckx					
F.W. Conrad					
M. Conrat					
Roshan Cools	Member				
Astley Paston Cooper					
N. Cornelissen					
J.J. Cornelissen					
P. von Cornelius					
Sir J.W. (John) Cornforth, jr.					
Johannes Gualtherus van der Corput					
Armando Cortesão					
Pieter Jacob Cosijn					
I. da Costa					
M. Coste					
D. Coster					
Julius Coulon Vitringa					
R. Courant					
Henricus Wilhelmus Couwenberg					
H.S.M. Coxeter					
Marius Crainic	Member				
J.S. Cramer					
Ronald Cramer	Member				
Jan Willem de Crane					
Hendrik Constantijn Cras					
L. Cremona					
Georg Friedrich Creuzer					
Eveline Crone	Member				
Pedro Crous	Member				
Paul Crutzen	Corresponding Member				
O. Cullmann					
F. Cumont					
Irène Curie, sp/o Joliot					
Pieter Curten					
Deirdre Curtin	Member				
H.W. Cushing					
Anne Cutler	Member				
Georges Léopold Chrétien Frédéric Dagobert Cuvier					
Hendrik Cuypers					
