= Members of the Royal Netherlands Academy of Arts and Sciences (D) =

The Royal Netherlands Academy of Arts and Sciences (Dutch: Koninklijke Nederlandse Akademie van Wetenschappen, abbreviated: KNAW) is an organization dedicated to the advancement of science and literature in the Netherlands. The academy is housed in the Trippenhuis in Amsterdam. Founded in 1808, members are appointed for life by co-optation.

== List of members (D) ==
Name	Type	Division	Date of election	Notes	Ref.
Hans Daalder					
Hans Daiber	Member				
K.T.A.M. von Dalberg					
Albert M. Dalcq					
D.G.B. Dalhoff					
Jan Dalhuisen	Corresponding Member				
Reginald Aldworth Daly					
Josephus van Dam					
Eric van Damme	Member				
K.W. Dammerman					
Jenny Dankelman	Member				
Johann Heinrich von Dannecker					
David van Dantzig					
G. Darboux					
G.H. Darwin					
Charles Robert Darwin					
Ingrid Daubechies	Foreign Member				
Hans Daudt					
George Davey Smith	Foreign Member				
J.B. David					
Martin David					
Jacques-Louis David					
Karel Davids	Member				
Henry Davy					
Peter Joseph Wilhelm Debije					
Laurens L.M. van Deenen					
F.J.H. van Deinse					
C. Dekker					
Cees Dekker	Member				
Nynke Dekker	Member				
P. Delaroche					
Wilke van Delden	Member				
Leonard Albrecht Carl van Delen					
G.H.M. Delprat					
Isaac Paul Delprat					
H.C. Delsman					
A. Denjoy					
Dominique Vivant Denon					
A. Despine					
Jan van Deth	Corresponding Member				
Arie Theodorus van Deursen					
Arwen Deuss	Member				
Wilfried Dewachter	Foreign Member				
Louis Dieudonné Joseph Dewez					
Patrick Dewilde	Member				
Hendrik Cornelis Dibbits					
Marcel Dicke	Member				
Karel Dicke	Corresponding Member				
Dennis Dieks	Member				
G.H. Dieke					
H. Diels					
J.N. Diercksens					
C.L. Diericx					
G. van Diesen					
E.J.D. Diest Lorgion					
J.E. (Emile) van Dievoet					
José van Dijck	Member				
Pieter van Dijk	Member				
C.M. van Dijk					
Peter ten Dijke	Member				
Robbert Dijkgraaf	Member				
Eduard Jan Dijksterhuis					
Bauke Dijkstra	Member				
Edsger Wybe Dijkstra					
Henk Dijkstra	Member				
Marjolein Dijkstra	Member				
S.C. Dik					
Marcel den Dikken	Corresponding Member				
Charles Dinarello	Foreign Member				
J. Dirks					
Ewine van Dishoeck	Member				
A.H. Djajadiningrat					
Boudewijn Dobbelaer de Wind					
W.H. van Dobben					
Willem Marius Docters van Leeuwen					
Marileen Dogterom	Member				
L.A.M.J. Dollo					
Franciscus Cornelis Donders					
M.A. Donk					
F.G. Donnan					
A.M. Donner					
J. Donner					
Jacques A.A. van Doorn					
Eddy van Doorslaer	Member				
H. Dooyeweerd					
A. Dopsch					
Ger. Dorn Seiffen					
W.A. van Dorp					
D.A. van Dorp					
H.W. Dove					
Sir Kenneth James Dover					
R.P.A. Dozy					
F. Dozy					
A.M.E. (Maartje) Draak					
Eite Drent	Member				
Jan Drenth	Member				
Pieter Drenth	Member				
S. Dresden					
Carsten de Dreu	Member				
G.W.J. Drewes					
Jacques Drèze	Foreign Member				
Egbert van Drielst					
Lou van den Dries	Corresponding Member				
Arnold Driessen	Member				
Petrus Driessen					
Huib Drion					
C.W. Drooger					
H.J. Drossaart Lulofs					
H.L. Drucker					
C.W. (Kees) Dubbink					
M.E.F.Th. Dubois					
Denis Duboule	Foreign Member				
A.J.P.C. Duc de la Chapelle					
J.F. Ducq					
H.C.J. Duijker					
Cock van Duijn	Member				
P. van Duijn					
J.J. Duistermaat					
Sir Stewart Duke-Elder					
J.B.A. Dumas					
J.J. Dumont					
F.A.C. Dumontier					
Jack Dunitz	Foreign Member				
Hermann Walther von der Dunk					
Daniël Dupré					
D. Durrer					
J.V. Duruy					
Louis Nico Marie Duysens					
J.J.L. Duyvendak					
J.Ph. Duyvendak					
Ph. Dwinger					
Pearl Dykstra	Member				
Antek Dymanus					
