= Members of the Royal Netherlands Academy of Arts and Sciences (F) =

The Royal Netherlands Academy of Arts and Sciences (Dutch: Koninklijke Nederlandse Akademie van Wetenschappen, abbreviated: KNAW) is an organization dedicated to the advancement of science and literature in the Netherlands. The academy is housed in the Trippenhuis in Amsterdam. Founded in 1808, members are appointed for life by co-optation.

== List of members (F) ==
Name	Type	Division	Date of election	Notes	Ref.
G.V.M. Fabbroni					
Carel Faber	Member				
B. Faddegon					
J.S. della Faille d’Assenède					
Anton Reinhard Falck					
Heino Falcke	Member				
Reindert Falkenburg	Corresponding Member				
P. Fallot					
M. Faraday					
Martin Fase	Member				
Cornelis Fasseur					
Michael Faure	Member				
R. (Robert) Feenstra					
Rhijnvis Feith (1753-1824)					
Hendrikus Octavius Feith					
Barend Felderhof	Corresponding Member				
Honor Bridget Fell					
Bert Felling	Member				
R. Fennema					
Ben Feringa	Member				
Guillén Fernández	Member				
G.P.J. Ferrand					
F.J. Fétis					
Carl Figdor	Member				
S. Figee					
H.E. Fischer					
Manfred Fischer	Foreign Member				
John Flaxman					
H.L. Fleischer					
A. Fleming					
Jacob Florijn					
P.C. Flu					
H. Focillon					
Willemijn Fock	Member				
H.C. Focke					
S.J. Fockema Andreae (1)					
S.J. Fockema Andreae (2)					
J.A. Fodor					
Carel Anthony Fodor					
Johan Pieter Fokker					
A.D. Fokker					
P.F.L. Fontaine					
René Foqué	Corresponding Member				
R.J. Forbes					
J. Forster					
L.W. Forster					
Ron Fouchier	Member				
A.F. de Fourcroy					
James Fox	Foreign Member				
Bas van Fraassen	Foreign Member				
J.M. Fraenkel					
Antoine Paul Nicolas Franchimont					
Joh. Franck					
C.M. Francken					
P.J.C. François					
Barbara Franke	Member				
Hans Franken	Member				
H. Frankfort					
Philip Hans Franses	Member				
J.J.A.A. Frantzen					
Marijn Franx	Member				
J.G. Frazer					
M.R. Fréchet					
P. Fredericq					
H.P.R. Frederikse					
Nicolaas Cornelis de Frémery					
P.J.I. de Frémery					
Daan Frenkel	Member				
Joost Frenken	Member				
Louise Fresco	Member				
F. Frets					
Hans Freudenthal					
H. Freundlich					
G.W.F. Freytag					
A. Frey-Wyssling					
R.H.Th. Friederich					
Nico Henri Frijda					
Willem Frijhoff	Member				
K. von Frisch					
A. de Froe					
J.A. Fruin					
R.J. Fruin					
A.N. Frumkin					
M. Fuhrmann					
M. Fürbringer					
