= Members of the Royal Netherlands Academy of Arts and Sciences (L) =

The Royal Netherlands Academy of Arts and Sciences (Dutch: Koninklijke Nederlandse Akademie van Wetenschappen, abbreviated: KNAW) is an organization dedicated to the advancement of science and literature in the Netherlands. The academy is housed in the Trippenhuis in Amsterdam. Founded in 1808, members are appointed for life by co-optation.

== List of members (L) ==
Name	Type	Division	Date of election	Notes	Ref.
Johannes Jacobus van Laar					
L. de Laborde					
F.A.A. Lacroix					
H.J. Lam					
Nicolaas Cornelis Lambrechtsen, van Ritthem					
P.C. Lammens					
W.P.A. van Lammeren					
Cor J. Lammers					
J.B. van Lancker					
J.P.N. Land					
L.D. Landau					
C.P. Landon					
Jacob Willem Langelaan					
G.E. Langemeijer					
C.D. de Langen					
J.P. von Langer					
E.T. Langer					
M.J. Langeveld					
L.M. Langlès					
J. Lanjouw					
P.S. de Laplace					
C. Lassen					
K. Latte					
A.D. Leeman					
C. Leemans					
Willem van Leen					
M. Leenhardt					
P. Leersum					
G. van der Leeuw					
Johanna E. de Leeuw, sp/o van Lohuizen					
J. van Leeuwen					
J.H. van Leeuwen Boomkamp, sp/o Hooykaas					
J. Legge					
Johannes Cornelia Maria Leijten					
Adriaan de Lelie					
Cornelis Lely					
David Jacob van Lennep					
Jacob van Lennep					
Andre Corneille Lens					
J. Lenting					
H.M.R. Leopold					
C.R. Lepsius					
Jean Baptiste Lesbroussart					
Jean Antoine Letronne					
M. Leumann					
Jan Lever					
S. Lévi					
Tullio Levi-Civitá					
H.T. Levin					
Claude Lévi-Strauss					
Henry David Levyssohn Norman					
baron Frédéric Auguste van Leyden van West-Barendrecht					
F.M.Th. de Liagre Böhl					
J. von Liebig					
G.I. Lieftinck					
P. Lieftinck					
Maurits Anne Lieftinck					
J.H.P. van Lier					
J. Lighthill					
F.K. Ligtenberg					
Petrus van Limburg Brouwer					
J. Lindeboom					
Franciscus Petrus Gerardus Maria van der Linden					
B.A. von Lindenau					
Hans Linnemann					
H.F. Linskens					
Jacob Hendricus van Lint					
B.J. Lintelo de Geer					
Antoine Lipkens					
R. Liston					
Pieter Antonie van der Lith					
J.E. Littlewood					
E. Littmann					
Rehuel Lobatto					
Cornelis Adriaan Lobry de Bruyn					
G.W. Locher					
A. van Loey					
J.H.A. Logemann					
J.J. van Loghem					
A.D. Loman					
G. Longhi					
Aafje Looijenga-Vos					
H. van der Loos					
Cornelis Loots					
Fernando Henrique Lopes da Silva					
Hendrik Antoon Lorentz					
T.Q. Lorin					
Johannes Los					
J. de Louter					
P.J.F. Louw					
E.E. Lowinsky					
Johann Heinrich Lübeck					
Johannes Lublink, de Jonge					
L. Luciani					
F.J. Lugt					
N. Luhmann					
Barthold Hendrik Lulofs					
Wilhelmus Anthonius Josephus Luxemburg					
C. Lyell					
F.G.A.B. van Lynden					
Frans Godard van Lynden van Hemmen					
B.F. Lyot					

=== Living members ===
Name	Type	Division	Date of election	Notes	Ref.
Harry van der Laan	Member				
Leo Laeyendecker	Member				
Ad Lagendijk	Member				
Inald Lagendijk	Member				
Steven Lamberts	Member				
Henny Lamers	Member				
Klaas Landsman	Member				
Christian Lange	Member				
Monique Laurent	Member				
Richard Lauwaars	Member				
Peter Leeflang	Member				
Joep Leerssen	Member				
Jan de Leeuw	Member				
Hans van Leeuwen	Member				
Henk Lekkerkerker	Member				
Hendrik Lenstra	Member				
Joop van Lenteren	Member				
Rob Leurs	Member				
Pim Levelt	Member				
Marcel Levi	Member				
Aart Liefbroer	Member				
Luuk de Ligt	Member				
Frank Linde	Member				
Siegwart Lindenberg	Member				
Harry Lintsen	Member				
Tanja van der Lippe	Member				
Detlef Lohse	Member				
Jan Lokin	Member				
Renate Loll	Member				
Eduard Looijenga	Member				
Mark M van Loosdrecht	Member				
Leendert Louwe Kooijmans	Member				
Bob Löwenberg	Member				
Sasha Lubotsky	Member				
Jan Lucassen	Member				
Leo Lucassen	Member				
Christoph H Lüthy	Member				
Hans Lambers	Corresponding Member				
Titia de Lange	Corresponding Member				
Sander van der Leeuw	Corresponding Member				
Jan de Leeuw	Corresponding Member				
Johanna Levelt Sengers	Corresponding Member				
Robert de Levie	Corresponding Member				
Walter Lewin	Corresponding Member				
Horst Lademacher	Foreign Member				
Kurt Lambeck	Foreign Member				
Jean-Marie Lehn	Foreign Member				
Ron Lesthaeghe	Foreign Member				
Arend Lijphart	Foreign Member				
László Lovász	Foreign Member				
