= Members of the Royal Netherlands Academy of Arts and Sciences (W) =

The Royal Netherlands Academy of Arts and Sciences (Dutch: Koninklijke Nederlandse Akademie van Wetenschappen, abbreviated: KNAW) is an organization dedicated to the advancement of science and literature in the Netherlands. The academy is housed in the Trippenhuis in Amsterdam. Founded in 1808, members are appointed for life by co-optation.

== List of members (W) ==
Name	Type	Division	Date of election	Notes	Ref.
Gustav Friedrich Waagen					
Cornelis de Waal					
Frans de Waal	Corresponding Member				
Hans van de Waal					
Joan van der Waals	Member				
Johannes Diderik van der Waals, Jr.					
Johannes Diderik van der Waals, Sr.					
Dirk de Waard	Corresponding Member				
Hendrik de Waard					
Bartel Leendert van der Waerden					
Willem Albert Wagenaar					
Jacob van Wageningen					
Hendrik Wagenvoort					
Peter Wakker	Member				
Johan de Wal					
Gabinus de Wal					
Frank W. Walbank					
Antoine Waldorp					
John Walker	Foreign Member				
Ernestine van der Wall	Member				
Jacob Walraven					
Jan van Walré					
Johann Gotlieb Walter					
E.C.G. Wappers					
L.A. Warnkönig					
Isaac Warnsinck					
Sybrandus Johannes Warren					
Walther von Wartburg					
Everwijn Wassenbergh					
Geerlof Wassink					
Jan Hendrik Waszink					
Jona Willem te Water					
Tjalling Waterbolk	Member				
Rens Waters	Member				
Willem Anthonius Josephus Maria van Waterschoot van der Gracht					
Peter Wattel	Member				
Pieter Engelbert Wauters					
A.F. Weber					
W.E. Weber					
Max Wilhelm Carl Weber					
Bert Weckhuysen	Member				
Michel Wedel	Corresponding Member				
Jean Baptiste Weenink					
Herman van der Wee	Foreign Member				
Bart van Wees	Member				
Hans van Wees	Corresponding Member				
Theodoor Weevers (2)					
Gerhard Wegner	Foreign Member				
K.Th.W. Weierstrass					
Olga Weijers	Member				
A.A. (Toon) Weijnen					
Pieter Weiland					
A.F.L. Weismann					
Pierre E. Weiss					
F.G. Weitsch					
Hein Wellens	Member				
René Wellek					
Susan Jacobus Wellensiek					
Willem Wenckebach					
Karel Frederik Wenckebach					
Sjoerd Wendelaar Bonga	Member				
A.J. Wensinck					
J.J. Went					
F.W. Went					
Friedrich August Ferdinand Christian Went					
Marinus Werger	Member				
J. Werninck					
Johannes Carel August Wertheim Salomonson					
J. van Werveke					
Benjamin Petrus van Wesele Scholten					
Hendrik Lodewijk Wesseling					
C.F. Wesselman					
Peter Westbroek	Member				
H.G.K. Westenbrink					
Nicolaas Westendorp					
Johan van Westenhout					
Johanna Westerdijk					
L.G. Westerink					
Pauline Westerman	Member				
Victor Westhoff					
Willem Hendrik Jacob van Westreenen van Tiellandt					
H.J.M. Weve					
Hendrik Engelinus Weyers					
H.K.H. Weyl					
Henricus Weytingh					
Joseph White					
George Whitesides	Foreign Member				
Gerardus Johannes Wiarda					
Tileman Dothias Wiarda					
Johan Pieter Wibaut					
Carl Ernst Arthur Wichmann					
Jacobus Theodorus (Koos) Wiebes					
David de Wied					
Marnix van der Wiel	Member				
C.M. Wieland					
E.D. Wiersma					
C.A.G. Wiersma					
D.A. Wiersma					
Douwe Wiersma	Member				
A.J. Wiertz					
Eugene Paul Wigner					
Aemilius Willem Wijbrands					
B.H.C.K. van der Wijck					
Ralph Wijers	†July 21, 2026Member				
J.W. van Wijhe					
Nicolaas van Wijk					
W.E. Wijk					
Cisca Wijmenga	Member				
Hendrik van Wijn					
Adriaan van Wijngaarden					
Leen van Wijngaarden	Member				
J.A. Wijnne					
U. von Wilamowitz Moëllendorff					
Ulrich Wilcken					
Frank Wilczek	Foreign Member				
Arthur Wilde	Member				
J. de Wilde					
G. Wildeboer					
J.E. Wildeman					
G.A. Wilken					
David Wilkie					
Frank Willaert	Foreign Member				
C.L. Willdenow					
Frans Willekens	Member				
Jan Frans Willems					
P.G.H. Willems					
Adriaan van der Willigen					
Volkert Simon Maarten van der Willigen					
Johannes Willmet					
Johan Wilhelm Wilms					
B.O. Wilpert					
Edm. B. Wilson					
Samuel (II) de Wind, (1793–1859)					
Cornelis Harm Wind					
Hans L. Windisch					
B. Windscheid					
Lambert Allard te Winkel					
J. te Winkel					
C. Winkler					
S.N. Winogradsky					
Jhr. Pieter Jan van Winter					
Samuel Wiselius, Iperusz					
Pierre de Wit	Member				
C.T. de Wit					
B. (Bernhard) Witholt					
C.G. Withuys					
Arjen van Witteloostuijn	Member				
Hendrikus Johannes Witteveen					
Dick Roelof Wittink					
Han Woerdman	Member				
M.W. Woerdeman					
F. Wöhler					
Henk Wolda	Corresponding Member				
Ellen van Wolde	Member				
P. de Wolff					
Pieter Maarten de Wolff					
J. Wolff					
Joseph Wölfl					
Dik Wolfson	Member				
H.R. Woltjer					
J. Woltjer					
Lodewijk Woltjer	Corresponding Member				
R. Woltman					
Klaas Worp	Member				
Rinus Wortel	Member				
B.A. Wortley					
A.S. van der Woude					
W. van der Woude					
F.A.E. van Wouden					
W. Wright					
G. Wttewaal Van Wickenburgh					
P.M. van Wulfften Palthe					
H.J. van der Wyck					
R.W.G. Wyckoff					
Peter Wyder	Foreign Member				
Daniel Albert Wyttenbach					
