= Members of the Royal Netherlands Academy of Arts and Sciences (Q) =

The Royal Netherlands Academy of Arts and Sciences (Dutch: Koninklijke Nederlandse Akademie van Wetenschappen, abbreviated: KNAW) is an organization dedicated to the advancement of science and literature in the Netherlands. The academy is housed in the Trippenhuis in Amsterdam. Founded in 1808, members are appointed for life by co-optation.

== List of members (Q) ==
Name	Type	Division	Date of election	Notes	Ref.
Hendrick Peter Godfried Quack	Member	Literature	19 April 1877	Died 6 January 1917. Legal scholar.	
Arend Quak	Member	Humanities	2005	Specialises in Baltic and Slavonic language and literature studies.	
Étienne Marc Quatremère	Corresponding Member	Third Class	5 July 1809	Resigned 26 October 1851. Died 1857. Orientalist.	
Antoine-Chrysostome Quatremère de Quincy	Associated Member	—	31 May 1826	Died 28 December 1849. Art historian, archaeologist and writer.	
Theo Quené	Member		1 June 1971	Died 4 June 2011. Technical scientist.	
Andries Querido	Member	Physics	28 May 1963	Died 30 January 2001. Medical scientist.	
Lambert Adolphe Jacques Quetelet	Correspondent	First Class	12 November 1825	Became a full Member on 3 November 1827; was then Supernumerary Associate from 29 December 1841 to 26 October 1851. Became a Foreign Member of the Academy (Physics division) on 26 October 1851. Died 17 February 1874. Mathematician and astronomer.	
