= Members of the Royal Netherlands Academy of Arts and Sciences (Y) =

The Royal Netherlands Academy of Arts and Sciences (Dutch: Koninklijke Nederlandse Akademie van Wetenschappen, abbreviated: KNAW) is an organization dedicated to the advancement of science and literature in the Netherlands. The academy is housed in the Trippenhuis in Amsterdam. Founded in 1808, members are appointed for life by co-optation.

== List of members (Y) ==
Name	Type	Division	Date of election	Notes	Ref.
Frances Amelia Yates	Foreign Member	Literature	14 April 1980	Died 29 September 1981.	
Maria Yazdanbakhsh	Member	Medical, Biomedical and Health Sciences	2020		
A. Young	Corresponding Member	—	19 October 1809	Died 12 April 1820. Agricultural scientist.	
Thomas Young, FRS	Corresponding Member	First Class	11 October 1827	Died 10 May 1829. Polymath.	
Annaeus Ypey	Corresponding Member	Second Class	16 July 1812	Became a full Member on 27 October 1828. Died 5 April 1837. Theologian and church historian.	
Petrus Johannes Maria Ypma	Corresponding Member	Physics	20 June 1978	Died 24 January 2002. Geologist.	
