= Members of the Royal Netherlands Academy of Arts and Sciences (U) =

The Royal Netherlands Academy of Arts and Sciences (Dutch: Koninklijke Nederlandse Akademie van Wetenschappen, abbreviated: KNAW) is an organization dedicated to the advancement of science and literature in the Netherlands. The academy is housed in the Trippenhuis in Amsterdam. Founded in 1808, members are appointed for life by co-optation.

== List of members (U) ==
Name	Type	Division	Date of election	Notes	Ref.
Eugenius Marius (Bob) Uhlenbeck	Member	Literature	13 May 1967	Died 27 May 2003. Specialist in Javanese literature and language studies.	
Christianus Cornelis Uhlenbeck	Member	Literature	30 April 1904	Died 12 August 1951. Comparative philologist and Sanskrit scholar.	
George Eugène Uhlenbeck	Corresponding Member	Physics	29 May 1951	Died 31 October 1988. Physicist.	
Jacobus Albertus Uilkens	Corresponding Member	—	19 October 1809	Became a full Member on 11 May 1819. Died 30 May 1825. Theologian and rural economist.	
C. C. Ullmann	Associate	—	25 April 1844	Resigned 26 October 1851. Became a Foreign Member in the Literature division on 10 April 1855. Died 12 January 1865. Theologian.	
A.J. Ultee	Corresponding Member	Physics	7 May 1929	Resigned 30 December 1932. Died 30 December 1964.	
Johannes Herman Frederik Umbgrove	Member	Physics	12 June 1946	Died 14 June 1954. Geologist.	
Willem Cornelis van Unnik	Member	Literature	18 May 1951	Died 17 March 1978. Theologian and church historian.	
C.J. van Ursel	Member	First Class	1 May 1818	Became a Supernumerary Associate on 29 December 1841. Elected a Foreign Member of the Academy in the Physics Division on 26 October 1851. Died 27 September 1860.	
Jhr Jacob Mauritz Carel van Utenhove van Heemstede	Corresponding Member	—	25 March 1809	Became a full Member on 28 May 1816. Resigned c. 1830. Died 1 September 1839. Astronomer, meteorologist and mathematician.	
Pieter Johannes Uylenbroek	Corresponding Member	First Class	19 December 1829	Became a full Member on 20 July 1833. Died 11 November 1844. Mathematician, physicist, astronomer and language scholar.	
