= Members of the Royal Netherlands Academy of Arts and Sciences (E) =

The Royal Netherlands Academy of Arts and Sciences (Dutch: Koninklijke Nederlandse Akademie van Wetenschappen, abbreviated: KNAW) is an organization dedicated to the advancement of science and literature in the Netherlands. The academy is housed in the Trippenhuis in Amsterdam. Founded in 1808, members are appointed for life by co-optation.

== List of members (E) ==
Name	Type	Division	Date of election	Notes	Ref.
Lex van der Eb	Member	Medical, Biomedical and Health Sciences	1987		
Carl Lodewijk Ebeling	Member	Humanities	1979		
Wiktor Eckhaus	Member		1987		
A.S. Eddington	Foreign Member		1926		
C.H. Edelman	Member		1958		
Bas Edixhoven	Member	Natural Sciences and Engineering	2009		
Dietz Otto Edzard	Foreign Member		1976		
J.J. Eeckhout			1830		
Mick Eekhout	Member	Natural Sciences and Engineering	2003		
L.D. Eerland	Member		1950		
J. Eggens	Corresponding Member		1937	Resigned in 1946. Re-admitted as Member in 1946.	
Jos Eggermont	Corresponding Member	Medical, Biomedical and Health Sciences	1989		
Paul Ehrenfest	Member		1919		
E.L. Eichhorn	Corresponding Member		1978		
J.G. Eichhorn			1815		
Heinrich Karl Abraham Eichstädt			1809		
Olivier Christiaan Eickma			1809		
Cees van der Eijk	Corresponding Member	Behavioural Sciences, Social Sciences and Law	2006		
Philip van der Eijk	Corresponding Member	Humanities	2006		
Christiaan Eijkman	Corresponding Member		1895	Resigned in 1898. Re-admitted as Member in 1907.	
R. van den Eijnden			1809		
H.J. van Eikema Hommes	Member		1983		
Albert Einstein	Foreign Member		1920		
Willem Einthoven	Member		1902		
S. Eitrem	Foreign Member		1946		
Cornelis Ekama			1812		
Ron Ekers	Foreign Member	Natural Sciences and Engineering	1993		
E.H. van Eldik			1809		
J.E. Elias	Member		1927		
Pieter Elias	Member		1857		
Naomi Ellemers	Member	Behavioural Sciences, Social Sciences and Law	2011		
Peter Elsbach	Corresponding Member		1979		
Paul Emmelkamp	Member	Behavioural Sciences, Social Sciences and Law	2001		
Adriaan van den Ende			1808	Resigned in 1841.	
Pieter Maarten Endt	Member		1957		
J. Endzelin	Foreign Member		1936		
Karl Enenkel	Member	Humanities	2008		
Pierre van der Eng	Corresponding Member	Humanities	2006		
Godfried Engbersen	Member	Behavioural Sciences, Social Sciences and Law	2007		
Theodoor Wilhelm Engelmann	Foreign Member		1870	Became a Member in 1897.	
H.G.A. Engler	Foreign Member		1920		
D.Th. Enklaar	Member		1948		
Ch.J. Enschedé	Member		1971		
Ecco Epkema (1759–1832)			1809		
P. Erdös	Foreign Member		1977		
François Zacharias Ermerins	Member		1855		
Jan Willem Ermerins			1836		
Mirjam Ernestus	Member	Humanities	2015		
L. Ernster	Foreign Member		1987		
Judith van Erp	Member	Behavioural Sciences, Social Sciences and Law	2018		
Florentinus Josephus van Ertborn			1830		
L.J.C. van Es					
Wim van Es	Member	Humanities	1978		
J.J. Eschenburg			1809		
C.C. van Essen	Corresponding Member		1951		
S.J. Esser	Corresponding Member		1937		
Willem Titus van Est	Member		1973		
A.J. Evans	Foreign Member		1918		
E. van Everdingen	Member		1921		
Ulrich Everling	Foreign Member		1990		
Andrea Evers	Member	Behavioural Sciences, Social Sciences and Law	2019		
M. Ewing	Foreign Member		1956		
P.N. van Eyck	Member		1946		
P. Eykhoff	Member		1988		
Jan Nicolaas van Eys			1808		
W.J.M. van Eysinga	Member		1926		
J.A. Eytelwein			1809		
