= Mary M. Horowitz =

American oncologist

- Born: Brooklyn, New York, US

Academic background
- Education: MS, 1991, MD, Medical College of Wisconsin
- Thesis: Comparison of chemotherapy and bone marrow transplantation for adults with acute lymphoblastic leukemia in first remission (1991)

Academic work
- Institutions: Medical College of Wisconsin

Mary M. Horowitz is an American oncologist who specializes in blood and marrow transplants.

== Early life and education ==
Horowitz was born to Irish-Italian parents in Brooklyn, New York. As the oldest of seven children, she was discouraged from attending college by her father. Despite this, she enrolled at the Medical College of Wisconsin for her Master's degree and medical degree. Horowitz remained at the institution for her residency in internal medicine and fellowship in hematology and oncology. Prior to beginning medical school, Horowitz gave birth to her first child.

== Career ==
After formal education, Horowitz joined the International Bone Marrow Transplant Registry in 1985 and began serving as its Chief Scientific Director in 1991. While serving in this role, she was appointed Research Director for the Stem Cell Therapeutic Outcomes Database of the C.W. Bill Young Cell Transplantation Program and Principal Investigator of the Data and Coordinating Center of the National Blood and Marrow Transplant Clinical Trials Network. As a result of her mentorships, Horowitz was the recipient of the 2010 ASH Mentor Award in recognition of the "significant impact they have made in the training and career development of many physicians and scientists in the field of hematology." Horowitz continued to study the effectiveness of transplantation as a treatment for life-threatening diseases and was recognized by the American Society for Blood and Marrow Transplantation with the 2014 Lifetime Achievement Award.

In 2019, Horowitz earned recognition from the American College of Physicians and Aplastic Anemia & MDS International Foundation. During the summer of 2019, she received the 2019 Harriet P. Dustan Award for Science as Related to Medicine from the American College of Physicians. Later, Horowitz was honored by the Aplastic Anemia & MDS International Foundation "for the significant impact her work has had on stem cell transplant and hematologic malignancy practice worldwide."
