= Jaap Verweij =

Emeritus Professor of Medical Oncology

Jaap Verweij is Emeritus Professor of Medical Oncology and Chair of the Department of Medical Oncology of the Erasmus University Medical Centre. He is currently Managing Director of the Cancer Drug Development Forum (CDDF).

Verweij graduated as a medical doctor from the Free University Hospital in Amsterdam in 1978. He obtained his PhD in 1986.

He is an ESMO Faculty Member for Principles of Clinical Trials and Systemic Therapy. He is a former editor of the European Journal of Cancer, was President of the Connective Tissue Oncology Society (CTOS) from 2001 to 2002, and is a former Vice-President of the European Organisation for Research and Treatment of Cancer (EORTC).

Verweij was elected a member of the Royal Netherlands Academy of Arts and Sciences in 2011.

He has an h-index of 101 according to Semantic Scholar.
