= Jacqueline van Gorkom =

Dutch astronomer

- Education: University of Groningen
- Scientific career
- Fields: Radio Astronomy; Galaxy Formation and Evolution
- Workplaces: Columbia University; National Radio Astronomy Observatory
- Thesis: Aperture synthesis observations of recombination lines from compact HII regions

Jacqueline Henrie͏̈tte van Gorkom (born 30 March 1947) is a Dutch radio astronomer and Rutherfurd Professor of Astronomy at Columbia University. Van Gorkom is known for her contributions to the field of galaxy evolution, particularly through observations of neutral hydrogen gas.

== Education and career ==
Jacqueline van Gorkom was born in Voorburg. She received her Ph.D. in astronomy from the University of Groningen Kapteyn Astronomical Institute in 1980. She worked at the National Radio Astronomy Observatory (NRAO) in Socorro, New Mexico for 8 years as a research scientist before joining the faculty at Columbia in 1988. She has held visiting appointments at the Raman Research Institute, Princeton University, California Institute of Technology, University of California, Berkeley, and the Kapteyn Institute. She has served as chair and Director of Graduate Studies for the Department of Astronomy and is currently the Rutherfurd Professor of Astronomy at Columbia.

== Research ==
Van Gorkom specializes in studies of neutral hydrogen, the most abundant element in the Universe, through observations of the 21cm hydrogen line. Her research focuses on the structure and evolution of galaxies and the role of gas in galaxy formation. Her research aims to address questions such as:

- How does the environment affect the evolution of galaxies?
- What are the residual signatures of the formation process around galaxies?
- Do galaxies evolve along the Hubble sequence?

She currently leads the COSMOS HI Large Extra-galactic Survey (CHILES) project, a 1000-hour observation using the Very Large Array. CHILES will study the morphology and kinematics of gas in galaxies between redshift z=0 and z=0.45 and serve as a pathfinder experiment for the Square Kilometre Array.

== Awards and honors ==
- 2019 - Hintze Lecture at University of Oxford
- 2016 - Karl G. Jansky Lectureship
- 2008 - Miller Professor at University of California, Berkeley
- 2006 - Elected corresponding member of the Royal Netherlands Academy of Arts and Sciences
- 2005 - Da Vinci Professor at the Kapteyn Institute
- 1985 - National Science Foundation Faculty Award for Women
