= Gerard Baerends =

Dutch biologist

Gerardus Pieter Baerends (30 March 1916, The Hague – 1 September 1999, Groningen) was a Dutch biologist and one of the most important representatives of the so-called classical ethology in the tradition of Nikolaas Tinbergen and Konrad Lorenz. Baerends' behavioral working group was the first of this specialty in the Netherlands and is still regarded as one of the world's most prolific, since from it alone 43 theses emerged.

In 1958 he became member of the Royal Netherlands Academy of Arts and Sciences.
