= Wiro Niessen =

Dutch scientist

- Born: 15 November 1969; Geldrop
- Education: Utrecht University
- Awards: Simon Stevin Meester award
- Scientific career
- Workplaces: UMC Utrecht, Yale University, Erasmus MC, University Medical Center Rotterdam, Delft University of Technology, UC Berkeley, UMCG, University of Groningen
- Thesis: (1997)

Wiro J. Niessen is a Dutch scientist in biomedical image analysis and machine learning. He is currently Dean of the Medical School at University of Groningen and Board Member of University Medical Center Groningen. He was full professor at both Erasmus MC, University Medical Center Rotterdam and Delft University of Technology from 2005 until 2023. He is founder and was scientific lead of Quantib, an AI company in medical imaging, which is now part of the AI division of RadNet. In 2015 he received the Simon Stevin Meester Award from the Netherlands Organization for Scientific Research. From 2016 to 2019 he was president of the Medical Image Computing and Computer Assisted Interventions Society. In 2017 he was elected to The Netherlands Royal Academy of Arts & Sciences and in 2023 he was elected to the Netherlands Academy of Engineering. He has served as director of the AI platform of the European Organization for Biomedical Imaging Research.

== Career ==
Wiro Niessen was born in Geldrop, on November 15, 1969. He received a master's degree in physics in 1993, and later a PhD in medical imaging from Utrecht University in 1997. Part of his MSc was carried out at the University of Wisconsin, part of his PhD research at Yale University. He was a postdoctoral researcher, assistant professor and associate professor at the Image Science Institute of the University Medical Center Utrecht from 1997 to 2004. He was appointed full professor of biomedical image processing in the departments of radiology and medical informatics at the Erasmus University Medical Center in 2005. His research foci include computer vision, biomedical image analysis, and computer assisted interventions. He was also appointed professor at Delft University of Technology at the faculty of Applied Sciences the same year.

In 2017 he was elected a member of the Royal Netherlands Academy of Arts and Sciences.

In 2023 he was appointed as the Dean of the Faculty of Medical Sciences, University of Groningen and board member of University Medical Center Groningen.

== Selected publications ==
- Poels, Mariëlle MF, et al. "Cerebral microbleeds are associated with worse cognitive function: the Rotterdam Scan Study." Neurology 78.5 (2012): 326–333.
- Vernooij, M. W., et al. "Prevalence and risk factors of cerebral microbleeds: the Rotterdam Scan Study." Neurology 70.14 (2008): 1208–1214.
- Frangi, Alejandro F., et al. "Automatic construction of multiple-object three-dimensional statistical shape models: Application to cardiac modeling." IEEE transactions on medical imaging 21.9 (2002): 1151–1166.
- Frangi, Alejandro F., et al. "Multiscale vessel enhancement filtering." International conference on Medical Image Computing and Computer-Assisted Intervention. Springer, Berlin, Heidelberg, 1998.
