= Gerard Adriaan Acket =

Dutch electrical engineer and emeritus professor

Gerard Adriaan Acket (born 9 September 1935, Utrecht) is a Dutch electrical engineer and emeritus professor. He worked in the faculties of electrical engineering at Delft University of Technology between 1981 and 1988 and Eindhoven University of Technology between 1991 and 2000. His workfield was optoelectronics.

Acket became a member of the Royal Netherlands Academy of Arts and Sciences in 1991.
