= Petra de Jongh =

Dutch materials chemist

Petra de Jongh (born February 20, 1971, in Utrecht, Netherlands) is a Dutch materials chemist, currently working as a professor of Catalysts and Energy Materials at the Debye Institute for Nanomaterials Science at Utrecht University. Her research spans many fields, tackling issues like converting and storing renewable sources of energy, developing lighter, sustainable batteries, reducing energy consumption, and designing catalysts for chemical conversions. De Jongh is the first female winner of the Gilles Holst Medal, which is given to outstanding researchers in the Netherlands, who have made significant contributions to the fields of applied chemistry or physics.

== Education ==
De Jongh completed her master's degree at Utrecht University in the Netherlands on August 28, 1995, in Physical Chemistry and Condensed Matter. She then graduated cum laude from the same university with a PhD in photoelectrochemistry on September 27, 1999. Her thesis was entitled "Photoelectrochemistry of Nanoporous Semiconductor Electrodes", and was completed under Prof J. J. Kelly and Prof. D. A. M. Vanmaekelbergh.

== Research and scientific contributions ==
De Jongh's research interests are renewable energy sources (specifically hydrogen batteries), catalysts, carbon dioxide conversion, and nano materials.

De Jongh's first postgraduate employment was as a research scientist (eventually senior scientist and project leader) studying nanocomposite thin, inorganic films for renewable energy applications at the Philips Central Research Laboratories in Eindhoven, Netherlands. She then moved to the group of Inorganic Chemistry and Catalysis at the Debye Institute for Nanomaterials Science at Utrecht University in 2004, where she researched catalyst preparation with Prof K. P. de Jong. In this lab, she began using mesoporous supports as models for catalyst preparation, functionality, and nanostructure. De Jongh investigates the stability of these supported nanoparticles under a variety of different applicable conditions. With the support of the ERC Consolidator Grant, she is designing new catalysts to renewably produce fuels and chemicals. De Jongh is also heavily involved in the development and advancement of batteries without fluid, which are lighter, safer, and more sustainable than fluid batteries.

De Jongh's most notable project is entitled "3D Model Catalysts for Sustainable Fuels and Chemicals". She created 3D models of catalyzing agents involved in the conversion of simple molecules (from solar resources and biomass) to more complex organic compounds and oxygenates. These catalysts, which are more sustainable and energy efficient, were created from mesoporous silica and carbon-containing compounds.

With the support of the NWO-ECHO Grant, De Jongh also investigates the structure and functional properties of nanostructure inorganic materials (especially those in mesoporous supports), such as fast ion conductors, to determine the implications of particle size, pore structure, and particle confinement on the applications of these materials for catalysis and energy use.

De Jongh co-wrote the editorial "Women of Catalysis" as part of an initiative to highlight the research and scientific accomplishments of the leading female minds in the field of catalysis. De Jongh has a spotlight description in the article as well.

== Awards and titles ==
De Jongh has received the following awards:

- NWO-Vici Grant (2012)
- NWO-ECHO Grant (2016)
- ERC Consolidator Grant (2014)
- ERC Advanced Grant (2024)
- Gilles Holst Medal (2023), awarded for her contributions to sustainable energy. She is the first female winner of this award.

== Memberships ==
De Jongh is a member of the following societies and academies:

- Netherlands: Dutch Chemical Society, Dutch Catalysis Society
- Netherlands: Royal Netherlands Academy of Arts and Sciences since 2018
- USA: American Chemical Society, Materials Research Society

She currently serves on the following Boards and Committees:

- Board of the Department of Chemistry at Utrecht University
- Academic Member group Sustainable Industry Lab
- Member of the Board of the Debye Institute for Nanomaterials Science
- Chairman of the UU ERC grant proposal support committee for the faculties of Natural Science and Geosciences
- Electron Microscopy Steering Board
