= Mia Gerhardt =

Dutch professor and medievalist

Irene Mia Gerhardt
- Born: 28 December 1918; Domburg
- Died: 13 November 1988 (aged 69)

Mia Irene Gerhardt (1918–1988) was a Dutch medievalist and professor of comparative literature at the University of Utrecht.

== Education and career ==
Her parents were Ida Blankevoort and Dirk Reinier Gerhardt. Gerhardt attended the Erasmus Gymnasium in Rotterdam. She went on to study French at the University of Groningen.

From 1946 to 1950 she was a scientific assistant at the University of Leiden. In 1950 she earned her Ph.D. Between 1950 and 1968 Gerhardt was a lecturer in French language studies. As such, she was connected to both the University of Groningen and the University of Utrecht. In 1968 she became a professor at Utrecht. In 1971 she became a member of the Royal Dutch Society of Science.

== Publications ==
- 1953: "Iets over het gebruik van de eerste persoon in verhalend proza"
- 1955: "Don Quijote. La vie et les livres"
- 1956: "Het droombeeld van de Gouden Eeuw"
- 1957: "Les voyages de Sindbad le marin"'
- 1963: "The art of story-telling. A literary study of the thousand and one nights"
- 1964: "Two wayfarers. Some medieval stories on the theme of good and evil"'
- 1967: "Old men of the sea. From Neptunus to Old French luiton: ancestry and character of a water-spirit"
- 1968: "Zevenslapers en andere tijd-verliezers"
- 1977: "Bestiarium morale: Commilitonibus suis carmina selecta seruit"
- 1988: "Het 'testament' van Adriaan Bommenee. Praktijkervaringen van een Veerse bouw- en waterbouwkundige uit de 18e Eeuw" (eindredactie)

== Scientific articles (selection) ==
- 1949: "Les premières traductions des Bucoliques". In: Neophilologus. Vol. 33, afl. 1.
- 1949: "Maupertuis". In: Neophilologus. Vol. 33, afl. 3.
- 1955: "L'Imagerie de Sylvie". In: Neophilologus. Vol. 39, afl. 1.
- 1957: "Malherbe et les Muses". In: Neophilologus. Vol. 41, afl. 1.
- 1958: "'L'Octavie' de Nerval". In: Neophilologus. Vol. 42, afl. 1.
- 1959: "Metrische schema's van het lange vers". In: Neophilologus. Vol. 43, afl. 3.
- 1962: "Medieval story-telling". In: Neophilologus. Vol. 46, afl. 3.
- 1965: "The ant-lion. Nature Study and the Interpretation of a Biblical Text". In: Vivarium. Vol. 3, afl. 1.
- 1966: "Knowledge in Decline. Ancient and medieval information on "ink-fishes" and their habits". In: Vivarium. Vol. 4, afl. 1.

== Personal life ==
Gerhardt was the sister of poets Ida Gerhardt and Truus Gerhardt. She married J. Engel, a professor of medieval Latin. After the death of her husband, Gerhardt moved to Domburg. Gerhardt was a member of the Netherlands Malacological Society. In 1977, Gerhardt took over the editorship of the yearbook of this society. Her collection of fossilised shells was donated to the Naturalis Museum in Leiden after her death.
