= Portrait of Johanna de Geer and her Children as Charity =

Painting by Ferdinand Bol

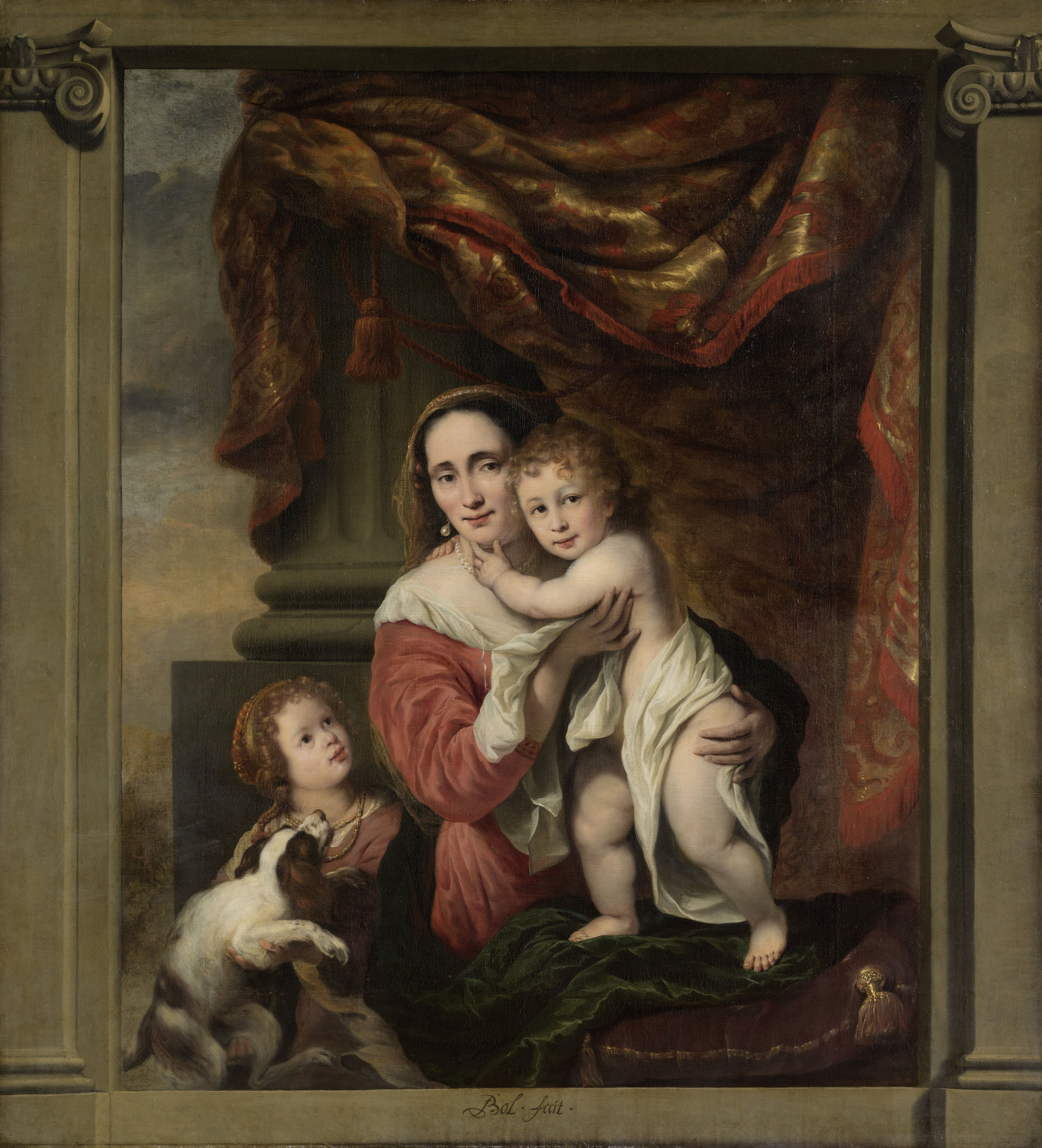
- Artist: Ferdinand Bol
- Year: c. 1664
- Medium: Oil on canvas
- Dimensions: 167 cm × 152.5 cm (66 in × 60.0 in)
- Location: Rijksmuseum; Amsterdam

Portrait of Johanna de Geer and her Children as Charity or Portrait of Johanna de Geer and her Two Children Cecilia and Laurens Trip as Caritas is an oil on canvas painting by Dutch painter Ferdinand Bol, from c. 1664. It is part of the collection of the Rijksmuseum, but hangs on long-term loan to the Royal Netherlands Academy of Arts and Sciences, also in Amsterdam. The painting is signed at the bottom center 'fBol · fecit ·' (Ferdinand Bol made [this]). It was probably made c. 1664.

== History and description ==
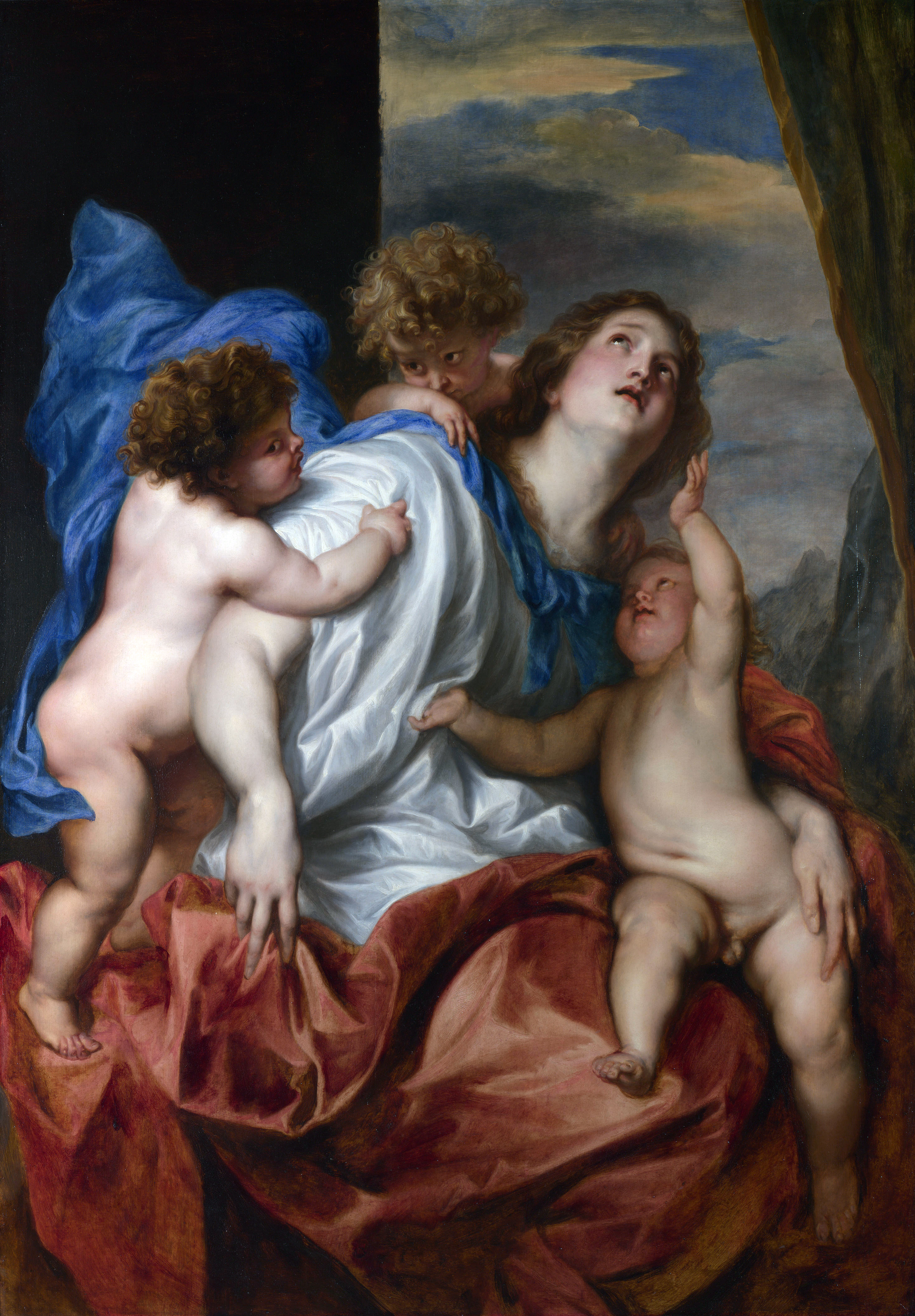
Anthony van Dyck. Caritas. 1627–1628. National Gallery, London.

It depicts Joanna de Geer, the second wife of the wealthy merchant Hendrik Trip, who together with his brother Louis, had the impressive Trippenhuis built in Amsterdam. The two children in the painting are her daughter Cecilia Trip (1660-1728) and her son Laurens Trip (born 1662). De Geer had herself portrayed as a caring mother, surrounded by her two children and a little dog. Thats why the work is interpreted as an allegory on charity. The painting presents the family of the title in a setting with a large and sumptuous curtain behind them, which partially covers a classical column. The left of the scene opens slightly to a landscape.

The painting was originally intended as a mantel piece in the Trippenhuis. The painted Ionic pilasters on the left and right used to connect with the further sculpted decoration of its chimney.

== Provenance ==
The work was located in the corner room on the first floor of the northern house of the Trippenhuis. The southern house was occupied by Hendrik's brother, Louis Trip. From 1816 to 1885, the Rijksmuseum was located in the Trippenhuis. In 1858 a renovation took place in which the 'main hall' was divided in two so that The Night Watch, by Rembrandt, and the Riflemen's Meal, by Bartholomeus van der Helst, could be placed opposite each other. It is possible that two of Bol's chimneypieces were removed from their original location and added to the collection of the Rijksmuseum.
