= Peter van Kessel (historian) =

Dutch historian (born 1933)

Petrus Josephus "Peter" van Kessel (born 25 December 1933) is a Dutch historian. He spent his career at the Royal Netherlands Institute in Rome, ultimately becoming vice director.

Van Kessel was born in Batavia, Dutch East Indies. He obtained a degree from the Radboud University Nijmegen in 1961. Van Kessel became an intern at the Royal Netherlands Institute in Rome in 1962. He obtained his PhD in 1963 with a thesis titled: "Duitse studenten in Padua rond 1600 en de controverse Rome-Venetië". Shortly afterwards he was appointed as secretary of the institute. Van Kessel would work at the institute until 1994, ultimately becoming vice director.

He was elected a corresponding member of the Royal Netherlands Academy of Arts and Sciences in 1977.
