= Trippenhuis =

Neoclassical canal mansion in Amsterdam

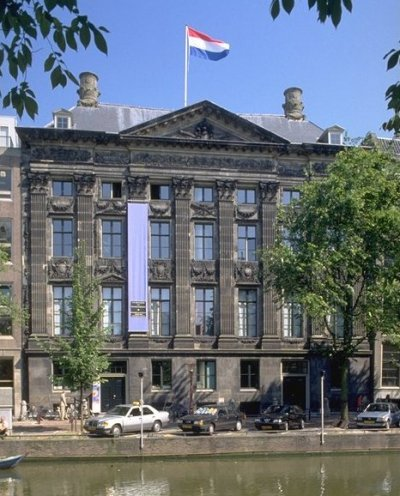
- Built for Louis and Hendrick Trip
- Interactive map of the Trippenhuis area

General information
- Type: Amsterdam Canal Mansion
- Architectural style: Dutch Baroque
- Location: Amsterdam, Kloveniersburgwal 29
- Coordinates: 52°22′16″N 4°53′58″E
- Completed: 1662
- Owner: Rijksgebouwendienst

Design and construction
- Architect: Justus Vingboons

The Trippenhuis is a neoclassical canal mansion in the centre of Amsterdam. It was built in 1660–1662 for the wealthy Amsterdam weapons traders Louis and Hendrick Trip. Many references to weaponry can be seen on its facade. Since 1887 it has been the seat of the Royal Netherlands Academy of Arts and Sciences (KNAW).

== History ==
The building was designed by the architect Justus Vingboons. It is a double house; two large homes built behind one single seven-window-wide facade for the sons Louis and Hendrick of Jacob Trip and Margaretha de Geer. It is the largest facade from the time period in Amsterdam, and is on the list of top 100 Dutch heritage sites. The Trips also commissioned Ferdinand Bol to paint Portrait of the Trip Sisters and Portrait of Johanna de Geer and her Children as Charity, which both originally hung in the building.

In 1730 the house on the right was remodelled for Elisabeth van Loon, but the left house still has many of its original details, including ceiling decorations by Nicolaes de Helt Stockade.

=== Koninklijk Instituut van Wetenschappen, Letteren en Schoone Kunsten ===
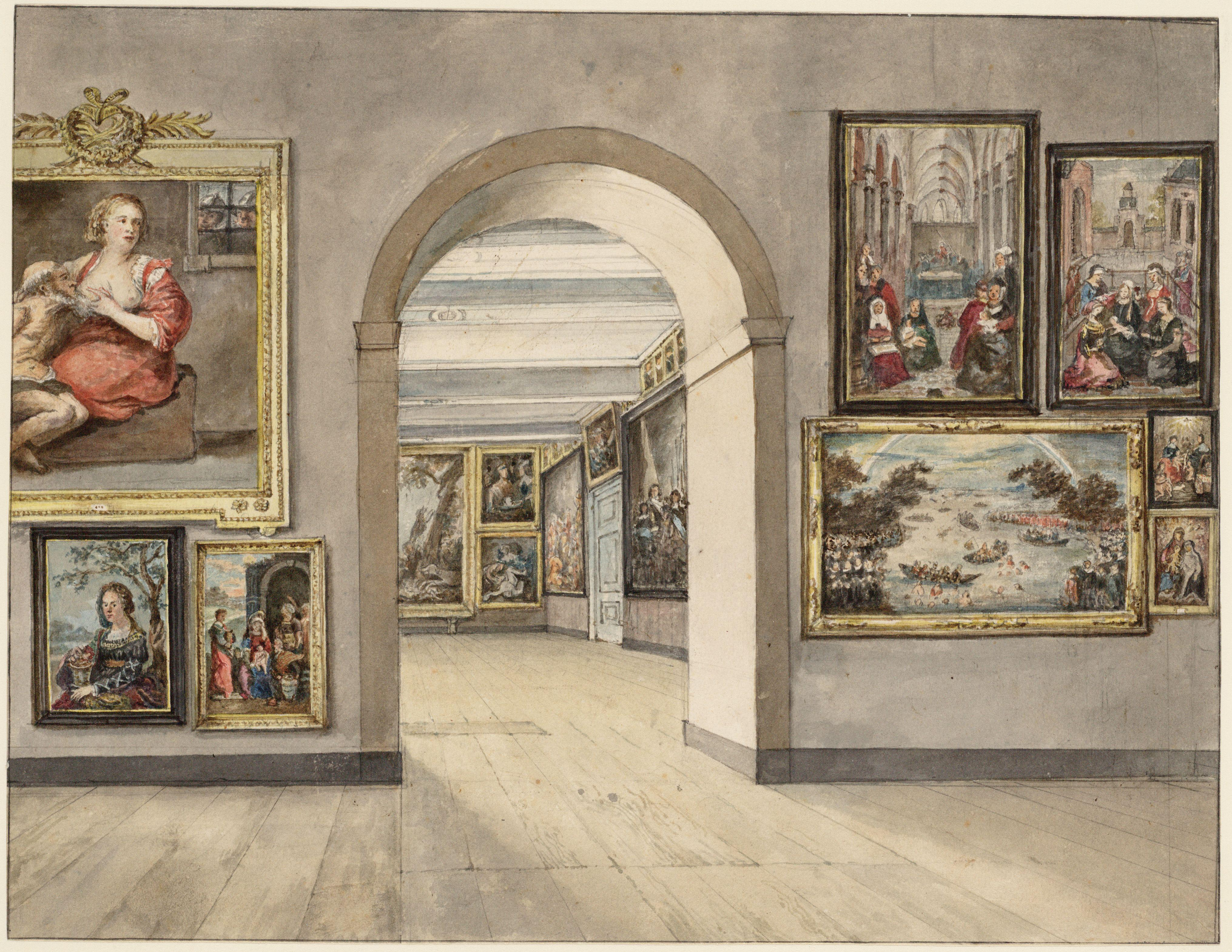
Interior of the Trippenhuis with the national collection, during the period 1825-1885

In 1812 the Koninklijk Instituut van Wetenschappen, Letterkunde en Schoone Kunsten moved there, the origin of the KNAW founded in 1808 by Louis Bonaparte (with the predicate "Koninklijk", meaning Royal). The other half was in use by the art dealer Cornelis Sebille Roos. After 1815, when the Netherlands were ruled by King Willem I, the two buildings were reunited under the name Koninklijk-Nederlandsch Instituut van Wetenschappen, Letterkunde en Schoone Kunsten and a national museum was opened in the former art dealership in 1817 as a follow-up to the Prince William V Gallery. It became quickly too small and the modern paintings were sent to the Museum van Levende Meesters located in Haarlem. The painting called the Nightwatch, by Rembrandt hung here until 1885 when it moved to the new Rijksmuseum. In 1851 the society was disbanded and re-established as the Koninklijke Akademie van Wetenschappen, which inherited the archives of the earlier societies with the prize winners and membership details of the four classes along the French model originally created by Louis Napoleon: Mathematics and Physics, Dutch literature and history, Ancient and Eastern Literature, History and the fine arts. Since 1938 the society has been called Koninklijke Nederlandse Akademie van Wetenschappen, though the Royal predicate was temporarily dropped during World War II.

In 2020 the renovated Trippenhuis won the Amsterdam Architecture Prize.
