= Hans van den Doel =

Hans van den Doel may refer to:

- Hans van den Doel (Labour Party) (1937–2012), Dutch politician of the Labour Party
- Hans van den Doel (People's Party for Freedom and Democracy) (1955–2010), Dutch politician of the People's Party for Freedom and Democracy
