= Ton Vorst =

Dutch economist

Antonius Cornelis Franciscus (Ton) Vorst
- Born: 1952 (age 73–74); Utrecht, Netherlands
- Occupations: Economist, academic, financial engineer, mathematician

Academic background
- Education: University of Utrecht

Academic work
- Institutions: Professor at the department of Finance of the Vrije Universiteit in Amsterdam, previously Professor in Finance at Erasmus University Rotterdam
- Main interests: Finance, financial markets, risk management
- Notable works: Prices and hedge ratios of average exchange rate options (1992), Pricing default swaps: Empirical evidence (2005)

Antonius Cornelis Franciscus (Ton) Vorst (born 1952, Utrecht) is a Dutch financial engineer and mathematician, Professor at the department of Finance of the Vrije Universiteit in Amsterdam, and Director of the VU Amsterdam School of Finance and Risk Management.

== Biography ==
Vorst received his PhD in mathematics in 1978 from the University of Utrecht for the thesis "Kn-regular curves" under the supervision of Jan Rustom Strooker and Wilberd van der Kallen.

In the early 1980s, Vorst started his academic career as a researcher at the Econometric Institute of the Erasmus University Rotterdam, where he was appointed professor in finance in 1989. With Harm Bart, he was co-director of the Econometric Institute from 1992 to 1998 as successor of Teun Kloek, and they were succeeded by Herman K. van Dijk. From 2000 to 2009, he was executive vice president of ABN AMRO, which was partly sold to The Royal Bank of Scotland Group in 2007. In 2006, he was also appointed professor at the department of Finance at VU University Amsterdam. He is head of the VU Amsterdam School of Finance and Risk Management, and is also the director of Graduate Studies for Finance at the Tinbergen Institute.

== Publications ==
Vorst has authored numerous articles on business finance, financial markets, risk management and derivatives. A selection:

- Vorst, Ton. "Prices and hedge ratios of average exchange rate options." International Review of Financial Analysis 1.3 (1992): 179-193.
- Boyle, Phelim P., and Ton Vorst. "Option replication in discrete time with transaction costs." The Journal of Finance 47.1 (1992): 271-293.
- Heynen, Ronald, Angelien Kemna, and Ton Vorst. "Analysis of the term structure of implied volatilities." Journal of Financial and Quantitative Analysis 29.1 (1994).
- Martens, Martin, Paul Kofman, and Ton CF Vorst. "A threshold error-correction model for intraday futures and index returns." Journal of Applied Econometrics 13.3 (1998): 245-263.
- Houweling, Patrick, and Ton Vorst. "Pricing default swaps: Empirical evidence." Journal of International Money and Finance 24.8 (2005): 1200-1225.
