= Christiaan Heij =

Dutch mathematician (born c. 1950)

Christiaan Heij (born 1950s) is a Dutch mathematician, an assistant professor in statistics and econometrics at the Econometric Institute at the Erasmus University Rotterdam. He is known for his work in the field of mathematical systems theory, and econometrics.

== Life and work ==
Heij did his PhD research at the University of Groningen in the 1980s among other young system theorists, such as Hans Nieuwenhuis, Pieter Otter, Jan Camiel Willems, and Dirk T. Tempelaar. In 1988 he graduated under Willems, Professor of Systems and Control and Nieuwenhuis with the thesis "Deterministic Identification of Dynamical Systems," which was published the next year by Springer in the "Lecture Notes in Control and Information Sciences" series.

In the 1990s Heij continued his research at the Econometric Institute of the Erasmus University Rotterdam, and wrote a series of books on systems theory, modelling, dynamics systems, and econometrics. With Jan Camiel Willems he supervised the promotion of Berend Roorda, who graduated in 1995 with the thesis, entitled "Deterministic Identification of Dynamical Systems."

Heij is credited extending "The behavioral approach to system theory put forward by Willems," and for presenting a new total least squares algorithms, specifically for system identification. His most cited work is the 2004 textbook "Econometric methods with applications in business and economics," co-authored with Philip Hans Franses, Teun Kloek, and Herman K. van Dijk, and published by the Oxford University Press.

== Selected publications ==
=== Books ===
- Heij C., Deterministic Identification of Dynamical Systems, PhD Thesis University of Groningen, Lecture Notes in Control and Information Sciences, vol. 127, Springer, 1989.
- Heij, C., Schumacher, J. M., Hanzon, B., & Praagman, C. System Dynamics in Economic and Financial Models, 1997.
- Heij, C., De Boer, P., Franses, P. H., Kloek, T., & Van Dijk, H. K., Econometric Methods with Applications in Business and Economics, Oxford University Press, 2004.
- Christiaan Heij, André C.M. Ran and F. van Schagen. Introduction to Mathematical Systems Theory: Linear Systems, Identification and Control, Birkhäuser, 2006; 2nd ed., 2021.

=== Articles ===
- Heij, Christiaan. "Exact modelling and identifiability of linear systems." Automatica 28.2 (1992): 325–344.
- Roorda, Berend, and Christiaan Heij. "Global total least squares modeling of multivariable time series." Automatic Control, IEEE Transactions on 40.1 (1995): 50–63.
- Heij, Christiaan, and Wolfgang Scherrer. "System identification by dynamic factor models." SIAM Journal on Control and Optimization 35.6 (1997): 1924–1951.
- Heij, Christiaan, Patrick JF Groenen, and Dick van Dijk. "Forecast comparison of principal component regression and principal covariate regression." Computational statistics & data analysis 51.7 (2007): 3612–3625.
