= Willem Somermeyer =

Dutch economist

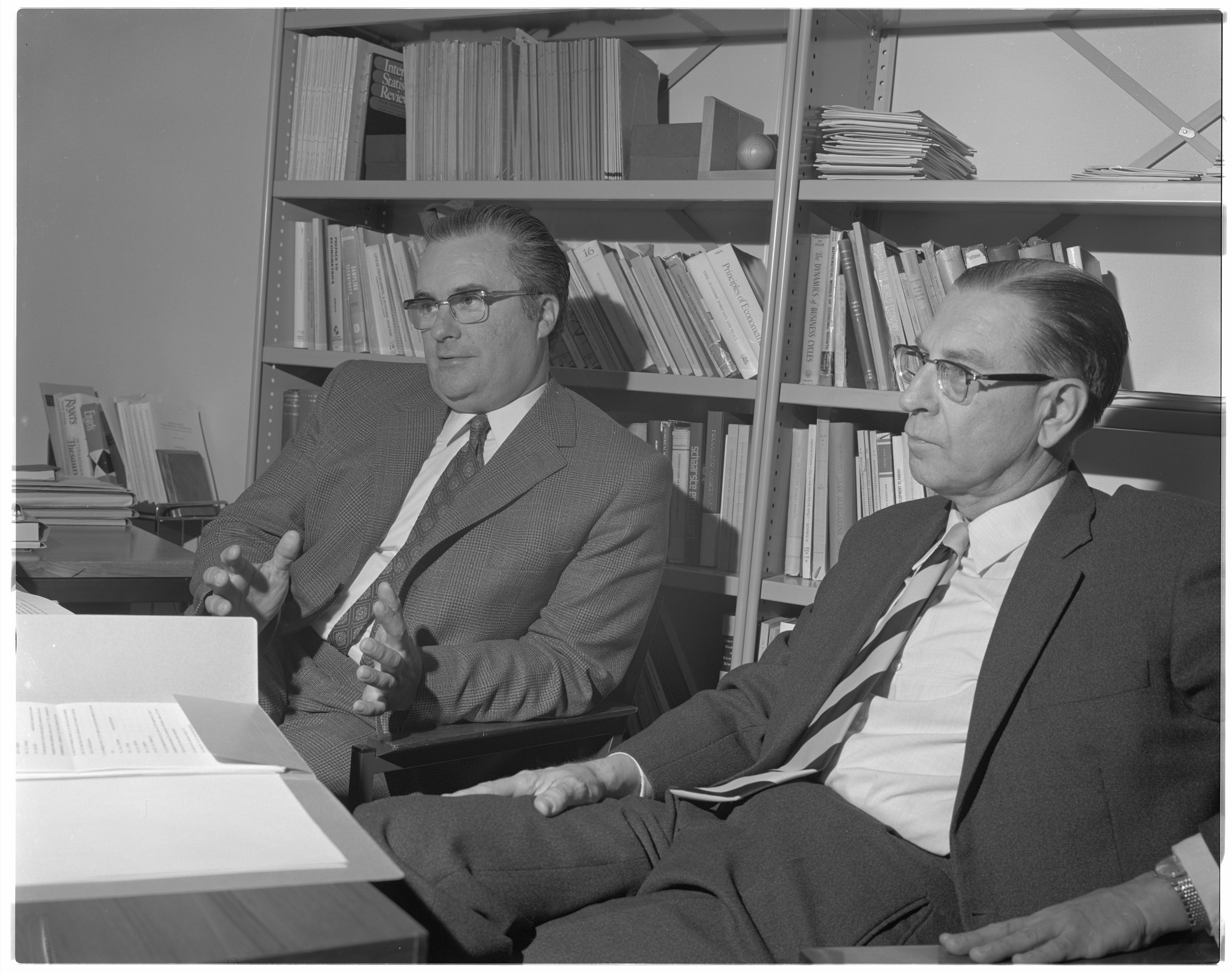
Two professors from the Erasmus University Rotterdam, on the right Prof. Dr. W.H. Somermeyer, 1972

Willem Hendrik Somermeyer (19 April 1919 – 30 May 1982) was a Dutch economist, Professor in Econometrics at the Erasmus University Rotterdam, and member of the Royal Netherlands Academy of Arts and Sciences, particularly known for his consumption-savings model.

== Biography ==
Born in Utrecht, Somermeyer started to study at the Delft University of Technology late 1930s. After one year he shifted to study law at the Leiden University. Later in 1965 he received his PhD from Jan Tinbergen at the Erasmus University Rotterdam for his study of income inequality conducted at the Statistics Netherlands entitled "Inkomensongelijkheid: een analyse van spreiding en scheefheid van inkomensverdelingen in Nederland."

Somermeyer started his career at the Netherlands Court of Audit, worked three year for the Bureau Documentatie Bouwwezen, and from 1942 to 1946 for the Statistics Netherlands under Jan Tinbergen. From 1953 to 1965 he worked again for the Statistics Netherlands. In 1965 he was appointed Associate Professor and in 1967 Professor at the Nederlandse Economische Hogeschool, in 1973 renamed Erasmus University Rotterdam. From 1971 to 1982 he was also director of the Econometric Institute as successor of Jan Sandee and succeeded by Alexander Rinnooy Kan and Teun Kloek.

His doctoral students were P.E. van der Dussen (1970), J. van Daal (1974), Guus Holtgrefe (1975), J. Blokland (1976), Wouter J. Keller (1979) and P.M.C. de Boer (1981).

== Publications ==
Books, a selection:

- 1965. Inkomensongelijkheid: een analyse van spreiding en scheefheid van inkomensverdelingen in Nederland. De Haan.
- 1973. A consumption-savings model and its applications. Contributions to economic analysis Volume 79. With Robert Bannink. North-Holland.

Articles, a selection:

- Nykamp, P., and Willem Hendrik Somermeyer. "Explicating lmplicit social preference functions." Economics of Planning 11.3 (1971): 101-119.
- Somermeyer, Willem Hendrik, and A. Langhout. "Shapes of Engel curves and demand curves: implications of the expenditure allocation model, applied to Dutch data." European Economic Review 3.3 (1972): 351-386.
- Somermeyer, Willem Hendrik. "Multi-polar human flow models." Papers in Regional Science 26.1 (1971): 131-144.
- Blokland, Johannes, and W. H. Somermeyer. Continuous consumer equivalence scales: item-specific effects of age and sex of household members in the budget allocation model. Nijhoff, 1976.
