= Keynes–Tinbergen debate =

John Maynard Keynes and Jan Tinbergen engaged in an exchange of letters in which Keynes initially commented and Tinbergen responded. This conversation was subsequently expanded upon in a book review by Keynes in 1939, which Tinbergen replied to in 1940, followed by a final remark from Keynes in the same year. This discourse is commonly referred to as the Keynes–Tinbergen debate. It was in the field of econometrics.

== Tinbergen's work ==
Tinbergen's work, titled "Statistical Testing of Business-Cycle Theories, vol. I, A Method and its Application to Investment Activity," centered on using the multiple correlation technique to explain fluctuations in total investment, investment in residential building, and investment in railway rolling stock. He sought to statistically test various economists' theories of business cycles by allowing economists to specify these theories, with the statistician's role being to compute regression coefficients and assess the relative quantitative importance of the predetermined variables. However, it was noted by subsequent observers that Tinbergen's method left room for subjective judgment in deciding whether an explanatory variable should be retained or discarded. In this regard, Tinbergen did not provide a systematic methodology for dealing with such issues.

== Keynes's work ==
In September 1939, John Maynard Keynes turned his attention to reviewing two extensive articles on studies conducted by the League of Nations. One of these reviews was focused on the work of Jan Tinbergen, and it was incomplete as of July 27. However, Keynes, having read Tinbergen's work in draft form the previous year, managed to complete his review by August 4, though he initially considered it too long and potentially a waste of time.

Keynes's comments on a draft of Tinbergen's study, his correspondence with Roy Harrod, who had also reviewed Tinbergen's work for the League of Nations, and his published review, all revolved around questions of methodology. Keynes was particularly concerned with "the logic of applying the method of multiple correlation to unanalyzed economic material, which we know to be non-homogeneous through time." His criticisms were articulated in the language of probability. Keynes had six main technical criticisms. The first five focused on issues like whether all relevant factors were included in the equations, whether these factors were measurable, whether they were independent to avoid spurious correlations, simultaneity, and collinearity, whether the functional forms (particularly Tinbergen's assumption of linearity) were appropriate, and whether the treatment of time lags and trends was satisfactory. These issues have been persistent challenges in the field of econometrics since its inception. The sixth topic Keynes addressed was the matter of induction. While he did not find any passage in which Tinbergen himself made inductive claims, he believed that the purpose of the entire exercise was, in fact, inductive. He noted that Tinbergen did not employ Lexis's procedure that he had praised in his work on probability, which involved breaking the period under examination into sub-periods to determine whether the results remained consistent. In the context of econometrics, this would be akin to testing for structural stability. Keynes suggested that the complex method used by Tinbergen might result in false precision, and he proposed that a more straightforward approach might be safer.

In his correspondence, Keynes went further than most, and certainly more than the majority of econometricians, in questioning the entire field of econometrics. He coined the term statistical alchemy. His skepticism echoed concerns he had previously raised in his work on probability and in his earlier disputes with Karl Pearson, contributing to a significant and thought-provoking discussion on the limitations and challenges of econometric methodology.
