= Lenstra =

The last name Lenstra may refer to:

- Abe Lenstra, former Dutch football player.
- Arjen Klaas Lenstra, Dutch mathematician.
- Hendrik Willem Lenstra, Jr., Dutch mathematician.
- Jan Karel Lenstra, Dutch mathematician.
