= Albert Wagelmans =

Dutch economist (born 1960)

Albert Peter Marie (Albert) Wagelmans (born 1960) is a Dutch economist and Professor of Management Science at the Erasmus School of Economics (ESE) of the Erasmus University Rotterdam working in the fields of mathematical optimization methods for production, public transport and health care planning.

== Biography ==
Born in 1960 in Rotterdam, Wagelmans received his MSc in econometrics at the Erasmus University Rotterdam in 1985, where in 1990 he received his Phd with the thesis entitled "Sensitivity analysis in combinatorial optimization," under supervision of Alexander Rinnooy Kan and Antoon Kolen.

Wagelmans had started his academic career at the Erasmus University Rotterdam as teaching assistant in 1982, became assistant professor in 1986 and was instructor at the MBA Executive Development program in 1987/88. In 1989 he was visiting researcher at the Université Catholique de Louvain, and in 1990/91 visiting researcher at Massachusetts Institute of Technology. Back in Rotterdam in 2001 Wagelmans was appointed Professor of Operations Research at the Erasmus University Rotterdam, where he held his inauguration speech "Moeilijk doen als het ook makkelijk kan" (Making it hard, when it can be done easily) about the usefulness of mathematical analysis in decision problems. In 2005, he was appointed Professor of Management Science.

From 1999 to 2003 Wagelmans was director of the Rotterdam Institute for Business Economic Studies (RIBES), and associate director of the Erasmus Research Institute of Management (ERIM). From 2001 to 2006 he was Director of the Bachelor-Master Program in Econometrics & Management Science, and from 2005 to 2006 also Director of the Bachelor-Master Program in Informatics & Economics. From 2006 to 2014 Wagelmans was Director of the Econometric Institute as successor of Philip Hans Franses, and is succeeded by Patrick Groenen. He is research fellow of the Tinbergen Institute since 1999, and fellow of ERIM since 2006.

Since 2015 Wagelmans is Chairman of the Dutch Society of Operations Research (NGB), and since 2016 he is Vice President 1 of the Association of European Operational Research Societies (EURO).

== Work ==
=== A Dynamic Lot-Sizing Model with Demand Time Windows, 2001 ===
In the 2001 article "A Dynamic Lot-Sizing Model with Demand Time Windows" published in Management Science, Lee, Sila & Wagelmans described the dynamic lot-sizing model and "the dynamic lot-sizing problem with demand time windows and provides polynomial time algorithms for computing its solution." They summarized this matter as follows:

One of the basic assumptions of the classical dynamic lot-sizing model is that the aggregate demand of a given period must be satisfied in that period. Under this assumption, if backlogging is not allowed then the demand of a given period cannot be delivered earlier or later than the period. If backlogging is allowed, the demand of a given period cannot be delivered earlier than the period, but can be delivered later at the expense of a backordering cost. Like most mathematical models, the classical dynamic lot-sizing model is a simplified paraphrase of what might actually happen in real life. In most real life applications, the customer offers a grace period - we call it a demand time window - during which a particular demand can be satisfied with no penalty. That is, in association with each demand, the customer specifies an earliest and a latest delivery time. The time interval characterized by the earliest and latest delivery dates of a demand represents the corresponding time window.

Jaruphongsa summarized that "Lee et al. (2001) generalize the classical (single echelon) dynamic lot-sizing model to consider demand time windows, and they provide polynomial time algorithms for two cases—where backorders are allowed and where they are not."

=== Multiple-Depot Integrated Vehicle and Crew Scheduling, 2004 ===
In the 2005 article "Multiple-Depot Integrated Vehicle and Crew Scheduling," Huisman, Freling and Wagelmans presented two new models and algorithms in the field of the vehicle routing problem, specifically for "integrated vehicle and crew scheduling in the multiple-depot case." they explained:

The algorithms are both based on a combination of column generation and Lagrangian relaxation. Furthermore, we compare those integrated approaches with each other and with the traditional sequential one on random generated as well as real-world data instances for a suburban/extra-urban mass transit system. To simulate such a transit system, we propose a new way of generating randomly data instances such that their properties are the same as for our real-world instances.

== Selected publications ==
Wagelmans has authored and co-authored numerous publications. Book:

- Freling, Richard, Albert PM Wagelmans, and José M. Pinto Paixão. An overview of models and techniques for integrating vehicle and crew scheduling. Springer Berlin Heidelberg, 1999.

Articles, a selection:

- Wagelmans, Albert, Stan Van Hoesel, and Antoon Kolen. "Economic lot sizing: an O (n log n) algorithm that runs in linear time in the Wagner-Whitin case." Operations Research 40.1-Supplement - 1 (1992): S145-S156.
- Van Hoesel, C. P. M., and Albert Peter Marie Wagelmans. "An O (T 3) algorithm for the economic lot-sizing problem with constant capacities." Management Science 42.1 (1996): 142–150.
- Shaw, Dong X., and Albert PM Wagelmans. "An algorithm for single-item capacitated economic lot sizing with piecewise linear production costs and general holding costs." Management Science 44.6 (1998): 831–838.
- Lee, Chung-Yee, Sila Çetinkaya, and Albert PM Wagelmans. "A dynamic lot-sizing model with demand time windows." Management Science 47.10 (2001): 1384–1395.
- Freling, Richard, Dennis Huisman, and Albert PM Wagelmans. "Models and algorithms for integration of vehicle and crew scheduling." Journal of Scheduling 6.1 (2003): 63–85.
- Huisman, Dennis, Richard Freling, and Albert PM Wagelmans. "Multiple-depot integrated vehicle and crew scheduling." Transportation Science 39.4 (2005): 491–502.
