= Kolen =

Kolen is a surname. Notable people with the surname include:

- Antoon Kolen (1953–2004), Dutch mathematician
- Mike Kolen (1948–2024), American football linebacker
