= Awi Federgruen =

Dutch-American mathematician

- Born: Geneva, Switzerland
- Occupations: Professor, Columbia University
- Known for: Operations Management
- Title: Charles E. Exley Professor of Management
- Awards: Distinguished Fellowship Award by MSOM, Presidential Fellow of INFORMS

Academic background
- Education: PhD in Operations Research
- Alma mater: University of Amsterdam
- Thesis: Markovian Control Problems, Functional Equations and Algorithms
- Doctoral advisor: Gijsbert de Leve, Henk Tijms

Academic work
- Main interests: Supply Chain Management, Dynamic Programming
- Website: http://www8.gsb.columbia.edu/cbs-directory/detail/af7

Awi Federgruen (born 1953, in Geneva) is a Dutch/American mathematician and operations researcher and Charles E. Exley Professor of Management at the Columbia Business School and affiliate professor at the university's Fu Foundation School of Engineering and Applied Science.

== Biography ==
Federgruen received his BA from the University of Amsterdam in 1972, where he also received his MS in 1975 and his PhD in Operations Research in 1978 with a thesis entitled "Markovian Control Problems, Functional Equations and Algorithms" under supervision of Gijsbert de Leve and Henk Tijms.

Federgruen started his academic career as a Research Fellow at the Centrum Wiskunde & Informatica, Amsterdam, in the early 1970s, and was a faculty member of the University of Rochester, Graduate School of Management. In 1979 he was appointed Professor at the Columbia University. In 1992 he was named the first Charles E. Exley Jr. Professor of Management, and holds the Chair of the Decision, Risk and Operations (DRO) Division. From 1997 to 2002 he was Vice Dean of the University. He serves as a principal consultant for the Israel Air Force, in the area of logistics and procurement policies.

Federgruen has supervised many PhD students; recent graduates include Yusheng Zheng (at Wharton Business School), Ziv Katalan (at Wharton Business School), Yossi Aviv (Olin Business School), Fernando Bernstein (Fuqua School of Business), Joern Meissner (Kuehne Logistics University), Gad Allon (Wharton Business School), Nan Yang (Miami Herbert Business School), Margaret Pierson (Tuck School of Business), Lijian Lu (HKUST Business School) and Zhe Liu (Imperial College Business School), see PhD in Decision, Risk, and Operations Placement.

Federgruen was awarded the 2004 Distinguished Fellowship Award by the Manufacturing, Service and Operations Management Society for Outstanding Research and Scholarship in Operations Management; and also the Distinguished Fellow, Manufacturing and Service Operations Management Society. He was elected to the 2009 class of Fellows of the Institute for Operations Research and the Management Sciences.

== Work ==
Federgruen is known for his work in the development and implementation of planning models for supply chain management and logistical systems. His work on scenario planning is widely cited, and the field has gained prominence as computers now allow the processing of large masses of complex data.

His work on supply chain models has wide applications in, for example, flu vaccine and the risks of relying too heavily on a single vaccine supplier.

He is also an expert on applied probability models and dynamic programming. In the wake of Hurricane Katrina, Federgruen was quoted on the subject of applying predictive models to minimize risk in disaster situations.

Together with Ran Kivetz, Federgruen analyzed available data regarding the issue of famine in Gaza concluding that "sufficient amounts of food are being supplied into Gaza”.

== Publications ==
Books, a selection:

- 1978. Markovian Control Problems, Functional Equations and Algorithms. Doctorate thesis University of Amsterdam.

Articles, a selection:

- Federgruen, Awi; Heching, Aliza (1999). "Combined pricing and inventory control under uncertainty" (PDF). Operations Research. 47 (3): 454–475. doi:10.1287/opre.47.3.454. Archived from the original (PDF) on 2014-05-14.
- Chen, Fangruo; Federgruen, Awi; Zheng, Yu-Sheng (2001). "Coordination mechanisms for a distribution system with one supplier and multiple retailers". Management Science. 47 (5): 693–708. doi:10.1287/mnsc.47.5.693.10484.
- Bernstein, Fernando; Federgruen, Awi (2005). "Decentralized supply chains with competing retailers under demand uncertainty". Management Science. 51 (1): 18–29. CiteSeerX 10.1.1.198.1317. doi:10.1287/mnsc.1040.0218.
