= Harm Bart =

Dutch economist and mathematician (born 1942)

Harm Bart (born 5 August 1942) is a Dutch mathematician, economist, and Professor of Mathematics at the Erasmus University Rotterdam, particularly known for his work on "factorization problems for matrix and operator functions."

== Biography ==
Born in Enkhuizen, Bart started his study at the Vrije Universiteit in Amsterdam in 1960. Here he received his BA in Mathematics and Astronomy in 1964, his MA in Mathematics with a minor in Dogmatics in 1969, and his PhD in 1973 with the thesis "Meromorphic operator valued functions" under supervision of Rien Kaashoek.

After graduation Bart started his academic career at the Faculty of Mathematics at the Vrije Universiteit as Assistant Professor in 1973, and Associate Professor at the Faculty of Mathematics and Computer Science in 1977. In 1982 he was appointed Professor at the Faculty of Mathematics and Computer Science of the Eindhoven University of Technology. In 1984 he became Extraordinary Professor of Mathematics and since 1985 Professor of Mathematics at the Erasmus School of Economics of the Erasmus University Rotterdam. From 1987 to 1992 he was Co-Director of the Econometric Institute, first with Teun Kloek and later with Ton Vorst. From 1996 to 2000 he was also Dean of the Erasmus School of Economics.

In 2004 Bart was decorated as Officer in the Order of Orange-Nassau. He has been elected Fellow of the Stieltjes Institute for Mathematics, and Fellow of the Tinbergen Institute.

== Publications ==
Bart authored and co-authored three books and over fifty articles.

- 1973. Meromorphic Operator Valued Functions. Vrije Universiteit, Amsterdam
- 1979. Minimal Factorization of Matrix and Operator Functions, Operator Theory: Advances and Applications, Vol. 1 With I. Gohberg and M.A. Kaashoek. Birkhauser Verlag
- 2008. Factorization of matrix and operator functions: The State Space Method (Operator Theory: Advances and Applications / Linear Operators and Linear Systems). With Israel Gohberg, Marinus A. Kaashoek and André C.M. Ran. Vol. 178. Springer.

Articles, a selection:

- Bart, Harm, and Seymour Goldberg. "Characterizations of almost periodic strongly continuous groups and semigroups." Mathematische Annalen 236.2 (1978): 105–116.
- Bart, H., Gohberg, I., Kaashoek, M. A., & Van Dooren, P. (1980). Factorizations of transfer functions. SIAM Journal on Control and Optimization, 18(6), 675–696.
- Bart, Harm, and H. Hoogland. "Complementary triangular forms of pairs of matrices, realizations with prescribed main matrices, and complete factorization of rational matrix functions." Linear Algebra and its Applications 103 (1988): 193–228.
