= William White (economist) =

Canadian economist (born 1943)

- Born: 1943 (age 82–83); Kenora, Ontario, Canada
- Education: University of Windsor (BA); University of Manchester (MA, PhD)

William R. White (born 1943) is a Canadian economist who was the chairman of the Economic and Development Review Committee at the Organisation for Economic Co-operation and Development (OECD) from 2009 to 2018. He is famous for flagging the wild behaviour in the debt markets before the global storm hit in 2008 (the Great Recession). In 2009, Dirk Bezemer, a Professor of Economics at the University of Groningen in the Netherlands, noted that White was one of the earliest to have predicted the 2008 financial crisis.

== Biography ==
Born in Kenora, Ontario, Canada, he was educated at the University of Windsor and the University of Manchester. In 1969, he began his career as an economist at the Bank of England, the central bank of the United Kingdom. In 1972 he joined the Bank of Canada, the central bank of Canada, where he spent 22 years. His first six years at the Bank of Canada were with the Department of Banking and Financial Analysis, first as an economist and finally as Deputy Chief. In 1978, White became Deputy Chief of the Research Department and was made Chief of the Department in 1979. He was appointed Adviser to the Governor in 1984 and Deputy Governor of the Bank of Canada in September 1988.

In 1994, he joined the Bank for International Settlements (BIS), the Swiss-based bank of central banks, as manager in the Monetary and Economic Department. From May 1995 to June 2008, he served as its Economic Adviser and Head of the Monetary and Economic Department. He retired from the BIS on 30 June 2008.

He predicted the 2008 financial crisis before the subprime mortgage crisis. In 2009, Dirk Bezemer, a Professor of Economics at the University of Groningen in the Netherlands, noted that White was one of the earliest to have predicted the 2008 financial crisis. He was one of the critics of Alan Greenspan's theory of the role of Monetary Policy as early as 1996. He challenged the former Federal Reserve chairman's view that central bankers cannot effectively slow the causes of asset bubbles. On 28 August 2003, White made his argument directly to Greenspan, at the Kansas City Fed's annual meeting in Jackson Hole, Wyoming at the Jackson Hole Economic Symposium. White recommended to "raise interest rates when credit expands too fast and force banks to build up cash cushions in fat times to use in lean years." Greenspan was unconvinced that this would work and said: "There has never been an instance, of which I'm aware, that leaning against the wind was successfully done."

In October 2009 he was appointed chairman of the Economic and Development Review Committee at the OECD in Paris. This committee carries on regular evaluations of the policies of both member countries and aspiring members of the OECD. In his capacity as chairman, he also contributed to meetings of WP1 and the Economic Policy Committee of the OECD. He retired from that position in March 2018. He was also a member of the Issing Commission, advising the German chancellor on G-20 issues. White has published articles on topics related to monetary and financial stability as well as the process of international cooperation in these areas.

In 2026, Federal Reserve chair Kevin Warsh appointed White, along with Greg Mankiw and Thomas Sargent, to lead a task force on the central bank's inflation framework.
