= Eugene Lawler =

American computer scientist (1933–1994)

Eugene Leighton Lawler
- Born: 1933
- Died: September 2, 1994
- Scientific career
- Fields: computer science, biology
- Notable students: David Shmoys, Tandy Warnow

Eugene Leighton Lawler (1933 – September 2, 1994) was an American computer scientist and a professor of computer science at the University of California, Berkeley.

== Academic life ==
Lawler came to Harvard as a graduate student in 1954, after a three-year undergraduate B.S. program in mathematics at Florida State University. He received a master's degree in 1957, and took a hiatus in his studies, during which he briefly went to law school and worked in the U.S. Army, at a grinding wheel company, and as an electrical engineer at Sylvania from 1959 to 1961. He returned to Harvard in 1958, and completed his Ph.D. in applied mathematics in 1962 under the supervision of Anthony G. Oettinger with a dissertation entitled Some Aspects of Discrete Mathematical Programming. He then became a faculty member at the University of Michigan until 1971, when he moved to Berkeley. He retired in 1994, shortly before his death.

At Berkeley, Lawler's doctoral students included Marshall Bern, Chip Martel, Arvind Raghunathan, Arnie Rosenthal, Huzur Saran, David Shmoys, and Tandy Warnow.

== Research ==
Lawler was an expert on combinatorial optimization and a founder of the field, the author of the widely used textbook Combinatorial Optimization: Networks and Matroids and coauthor of The Traveling Salesman Problem: a guided tour of combinatorial optimization. He played a central role in rescuing the ellipsoid method for linear programming from obscurity in the West. He also wrote (with D. E. Wood) a heavily cited 1966 survey on branch and bound algorithms, selected as a citation classic in 1987, and another influential early paper on dynamic programming with J. M. Moore. Lawler was also the first to observe that matroid intersection can be solved in polynomial time.

The NP-completeness proofs for two of Karp's 21 NP-complete problems, directed Hamiltonian cycle and 3-dimensional matching, were credited by Karp to Lawler. The NP-completeness of 3-dimensional matching is an example of one of Lawler's favorite observations, the "mystical power of twoness": for many combinatorial optimization problems that can be parametrized by an integer, the problem can be solved in polynomial time when the parameter is two but becomes NP-complete when the parameter is three. For 3-dimensional matching, the solvable parameter-2 version of the problem is graph matching; the same phenomenon arises in the complexities of 2-coloring and 3-coloring for graphs, in the matroid intersection problem for intersections of two or three matroids, and in 2-SAT and 3-SAT for satisfiability problems. Lenstra writes that "Gene would invariably comment that this is why a world with two sexes has been devised."

During the 1970s, Lawler made great headway in systematizing algorithms for job shop scheduling. His 1979 survey on the subject introduced the three-field notation for theoretic scheduling problems, which (despite the existence of earlier notations) became standard in the study of scheduling algorithms. Another later survey is also highly cited (over 1000 citations each in Google scholar).

In the late 1980s, Lawler shifted his research focus to problems of computational biology, including the reconstruction of evolutionary trees and several works on sequence alignment.

== Social activism ==
In Spring 1969, while on sabbatical in Berkeley, Lawler took part in a protest against the Vietnam War that led to the arrests of 483 protesters, including Lawler; Richard Karp bailed him out. Karp recalls Lawler as "the social conscience of the CS Division, always looking out for the welfare of students and especially concerned for women, minorities and handicapped students".

== Awards and honors ==
A special issue of the journal Mathematical Programming (vol. 82, issues 1–2) was dedicated in Lawler's honor in 1998.

The ACM Eugene L. Lawler Award is given by the Association for Computing Machinery every two years for "humanitarian contributions within computer science and informatics".

== Books ==
- Combinatorial Optimization: Networks and Matroids (Holt, Rinehart, and Winston 1976, ISBN 978-0-03-084866-7, republished by Dover Books in 2001, ISBN 978-0-486-41453-9). Lenstra and Shmoys write that this book is a classic and that "it helped to shape an emerging field of research".
- The Traveling Salesman Problem: a guided tour of combinatorial optimization (with J. K. Lenstra, A. H. G. Rinnooy Kan, and D. Shmoys, Wiley, 1985, ISBN 978-0-471-90413-7).
- Selected publications of Eugene L. Lawler (K. Aardal, J. K. Lenstra, F. Maffioli, and D. Shmoys, eds., CWI Tracts 126, Centrum Wiskunde & Informatica, 1999, ISBN 978-90-6196-484-1). Reprints of 26 of Lawler's research papers.
