= Hennipman =

Hennipman is a surname. Notable people with the surname include:

- Pieter Hennipman (1911–1994), Dutch economist
- Truus Hennipman (1943–2024), Dutch athlete
