= Petra Schuurman =

Dutch chess player

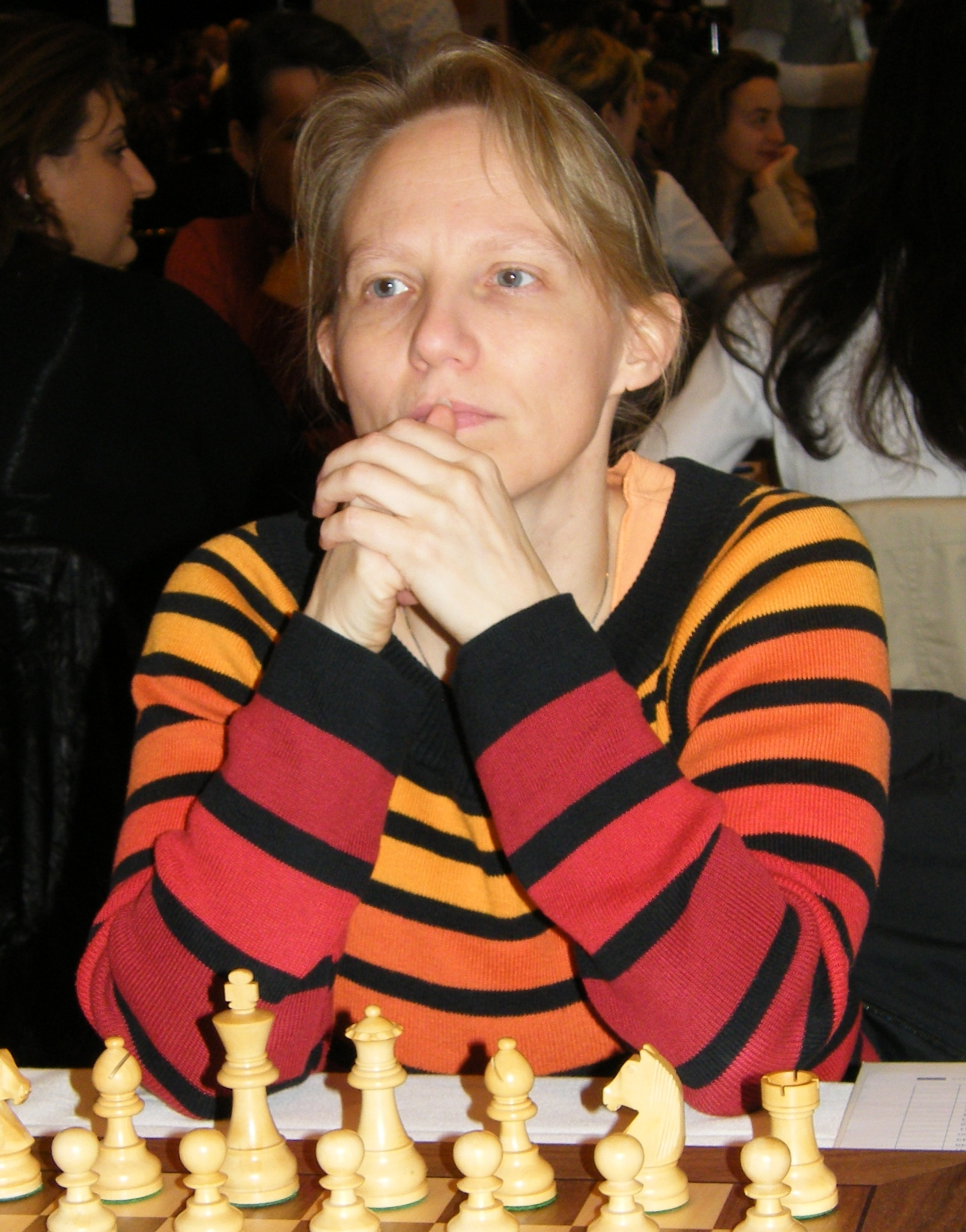
- Petra Schuurman in 2008

Personal information
- Born: 9 June 1968 (age 58)

Chess career
- Country: Netherlands
- Title: FIDE Master (2003)
- Peak rating: 2354 (November 2009)
- Scientific career
- Thesis: Approximating schedules (2001)
- Doctoral advisor: Jan Karel Lenstra; Gerhard J. Woeginger

Petra Schuurman (born 9 June 1968) is a Dutch chess FIDE Master (FM) (2003) and Dutch Women's Chess Championship medalist (2003, 2004, 2008).

== Biography ==
In the 2000s, Petra Schuurman was one of the leading female Dutch chess players. She competed many times in the finals of the Dutch Women's Chess Championships, winning three medals: silver (2008) and two bronze (2003, 2004). In 2004, Petra Schuurman came third in one of the Corus festival's side tournaments in Wijk aan Zee and won the Open chess tournament in Austria.

Petra Schuurman played for the Netherlands in the Women's Chess Olympiads:

- In 2002, at the third board in the 35th Chess Olympiad (women) in Bled (+6, =2, -4),
- In 2004, at the third board in the 36th Chess Olympiad (women) in Calvià (+5, =4, -2),
- In 2006, at the third board in the 37th Chess Olympiad (women) in Turin (+3, =3, -3),
- In 2008, at the second board in the 38th Chess Olympiad (women) in Dresden (+4, =3, -2).

Schuurman played for the Netherlands in the European Team Chess Championship:

- In 2001, at the first reserve board in the 4th European Team Chess Championship (women) in León (+0, =2, -1),
- In 2003, at the first reserve board in the 5th European Team Chess Championship (women) in Plovdiv (+3, =1, -2),
- In 2005, at the third board in the 6th European Team Chess Championship (women) in Gothenburg (+3, =5, -0),
- In 2007, at the fourth board in the 7th European Team Chess Championship (women) in Heraklion (+2, =3, -2),
- In 2009, at the second board in the 8th European Team Chess Championship (women) in Novi Sad (+3, =2, -1).

Schuurman has a doctorate in mathematics and computer science from Eindhoven University of Technology, earned in 2001 under the joint supervision of Jan Karel Lenstra and Gerhard J. Woeginger.
