= Marjan van den Akker =

Dutch computer scientist and operations researcher

Janna Magrietje (Marjan) van den Akker (born 1965) is a Dutch computer scientist and operations researcher specializing in scheduling algorithms with applications including transportation and software engineering. She is an associate professor in the Department of Information and Computing Sciences at Utrecht University, where she directs the Utrecht AI & Mobility Lab and Robust Rail Lab. She also holds a research affiliation with KLM Royal Dutch Airlines.

== Education and career ==
Van den Akker completed her Ph.D. in 1994 at the Eindhoven University of Technology, with the dissertation LP-based solution methods for single-machine scheduling problems jointly supervised by Jan Karel Lenstra and Martin Savelsbergh.

After postdoctoral research at the Center for Operations Research and Econometrics in Belgium, she worked for several years as a consultant for the Dutch National Aerospace Laboratory. In 2000 she returned to academia as an assistant professor at Utrecht University, in the group of Hans L. Bodlaender. She is currently an associate professor there.
