= Petros Serghiou Florides =

Greek Cypriot mathematical physicist (1937–2023)

Petros S. Florides
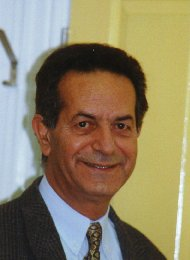
- Petros Florides in 1998
- Born: 16 February 1937; Lapithos, Cyprus
- Died: 30 October 2023 (aged 86); Athens, Greece
- Education: Trinity College Dublin; Peterhouse, Cambridge
- Alma mater: University of London, Royal Holloway
- Scientific career
- Fields: Mathematics, General Relativity
- Institutions: Trinity College Dublin
- Academic advisors: William McCrea
- Doctoral students: Phelim Boyle

Petros Serghiou Florides (16 February 1937 – 30 October 2023) was a Greek Cypriot mathematical physicist.

He was born in Lapithos, Cyprus, and in 1958 received his bachelor's degree from the University of London. His 1960 PhD from Royal Holloway on "Problems in Relativity Theory and Relativistic Cosmology" was supervised by William McCrea. After a postdoc with John L Synge at the Dublin Institute for Advanced Studies, he settled at Trinity College Dublin in 1962. There he spent over four decades, rising to the rank of senior fellow and pro-chancellor. In 1964 he was awarded a Master of Arts (juri officii).

He was member of the Reviewing Body of the "Mathematical Reviews" (1963-1980), member of the Preparatory Committee for the Establishment of the University of Cyprus (1988-1992), chairman of the Selection Committee for the Mathematics and Statistics Department of the University of Cyprus (1990-1996), chairman of the Peer Review Group for the first Quality Assessment of Third Level Institutions in Greece (1995), and chairman of the Local Organising Committee of the 17th International Conference on General Relativity and Gravitation, held in Dublin at the RDS Convention Centre from 18 – 23 July 2004 (2001-2004). He was life member of the International Society on General Relativity and Gravitation, fellow of the Royal Astronomical Society, London (since 1963), and a patron (and past president) of the Irish Hellenic Society. He was a former pro-chancellor of Trinity College Dublin from 2010–2012. In 2012, he edited a book on Edward Hutchinson Synge with Denis Weaire and John F. Donegan.
