= Antoon Kolen =

Anthonius Wilhelmus Johannes (Antoon) Kolen (22 May 1953 – 3 October 2004) was a Dutch mathematician and Professor at the Maastricht University, in the Department of Quantitative Economics. He is known for his work on dynamic programming, such as interval scheduling and mathematical optimization.

== Biography ==
Born in Tilburg, Kolen obtained his engineering degree from the Eindhoven University of Technology in 1978. In 1982, he obtained his PhD at the Centrum Wiskunde & Informatica, University of Amsterdam under Gijsbert de Leve and Jan Karel Lenstra with the thesis, entitled "Location Problems on Trees and in the Rectilinear Plane."

After his graduation, Kolen started his academic career at the Econometric Institute of Erasmus University Rotterdam. Late 1980s he moved to the Maastricht University, where he was appointed Professor at the Department of Quantitative Economics and head of its operations research group.

His PhD students at the Erasmus University Rotterdam were Leo Kroon (graduated in 1990), Albert Wagelmans (1990), C. Stan van Hoesel (1991), Wim Pijls (1991), Peter Verbeek (1991), and A. Woerlee (1991); W. Hennen at the Wageningen University and Research Centre (graduated in 1995), and at the Maastricht University Alwin Oerlemans (graduated in 1992), Ron van der Wal (1995), Maarten Oosten (1996), Jons van de Klundert (1996), Robert van de Leensel (1999), Arie Koster (1999), and Alexander Grigoriev (2003).

== Selected publications ==
- Antoon Kolen. Location Problems on Trees and in the Rectilinear Plane. PhD thesis, Universiteit van Amsterdam, 1982.
- Kolen, Antoon WJ, and Arie Tamir. Covering problems. Econometric Institute, 1984.

Articles, a selection:

- Brouwer, Andries E., and Antoon WJ Kolen. "A super-balanced hypergraph has a nest point." Stichting Mathematisch Centrum. Zuivere Wiskunde ZW 146/80 (1980): 1-7.
- Hoffman, Alan J., A. W. J. Kolen, and Michel Sakarovitch. "Totally-balanced and greedy matrices." SIAM Journal on Algebraic and Discrete Methods 6.4 (1985): 721-730.
- Kolen, Antoon WJ, A. H. G. Rinnooy Kan, and H. W. J. M. Trienekens. "Vehicle routing with time windows." Operations Research 35.2 (1987): 266-273.
- Wagelmans, Albert, Stan Van Hoesel, and Antoon Kolen. "Economic lot sizing: an O (n log n) algorithm that runs in linear time in the Wagner-Whitin case." Operations Research 40.1-Supplement - 1 (1992): pp. 145–156.
- Koster, Arie MCA, Stan P.M. Van Hoesel, and Antoon WJ Kolen. "The partial constraint satisfaction problem: Facets and lifting theorems." Operations research letters 23.3 (1998): 89-97.
- Kolen, Antoon. "A genetic algorithm for the partial binary constraint satisfaction problem: an application to a frequency assignment problem." Statistica Neerlandica 61.1 (2007): 4-15.
