= Maarten Janssen =

Dutch economist

Maarten Christiaan Wilhelmus Janssen (born September 19, 1962 in Breda) is a Dutch economist and university professor of microeconomics at the University of Vienna. He is particularly known for his work on consumer search behavior and auction theory.

== Education ==
Janssen studied econometrics and philosophy of economics at the University of Groningen, where he received his PhD in 1990. From 1997 to 2008, he was professor of microeconomics at Erasmus University Rotterdam and director of the Tinbergen Institute from 2004 to 2009. Since 2008, Janssen has been professor of microeconomics at the Department of Economics, University of Vienna.

== Scientific contribution ==
Janssen's research focus is theoretical industrial economics. In particular, he conducts research on consumer search behavior and auctions, and has made several methodological contributions in the area of consumer search theory. In addition, Janssen has launched a new subfield that studies the effects of consumer search in vertically structured industries. In auction theory, Janssen studies the interaction between the way firms bid in auctions and the way they compete in markets after the auction. This is particularly important in spectrum auctions for mobile telecommunications.

Janssen has served as a visiting professor in Moscow and Paris (Université Paris 1 Panthéon-Sorbonne), as well as in the U.S. (Duke University) and Belgium (Université Catholique de Louvain), among other places. In 2023, he will assume the Distinguished Visiting Austrian Chair Professorship at Stanford University.

== Memberships ==
Janssen is a member of the Dutch scientific Royal Holland Society of Sciences and Humanities. In 2017, he was accepted as a Research Fellow at the Center for Economic Policy Research (CEPR) in London.

== Awards ==
In 2017, the National Research University Higher School of Economics in Moscow awarded Janssen an honorary degree.

== Publications ==
Janssen has published over 50 scholarly articles in journals such as the American Economic Review, the Review of Economic Studies, the Journal of Economic Theory, The RAND Journal of Economics, the Journal of the European Economic Association, the American Economic Journal: Microeconomics, and the Economic Journal. A complete list of publications can be found on the University of Vienna webpage.
