= Macroeconomic policy instruments =

Macroeconomic policy instruments are macroeconomic quantities that can be directly controlled by an economic policy maker. Instruments can be divided into two subsets: a) monetary policy instruments and b) fiscal policy instruments. Monetary policy is conducted by the central bank of a country (such as the Federal Reserve in the U.S.) or of a supranational region (such as the Euro zone). Fiscal policy is conducted by the executive and legislative branches of the government and deals with managing a nation’s budget.

== Monetary policy ==
Monetary policy instruments are used for managing short-term rates (the federal funds rate and discount rates in the U.S.), and changing reserve requirements for commercial banks. Monetary policy can be either expansive for the economy (short-term rates low relative to the inflation rate) or restrictive for the economy (short-term rates high relative to the inflation rate). Historically, the major objective of monetary policy had been to use these policy instruments to manage or curb domestic inflation. More recently, central bankers have often focused on a second objective: managing economic growth, as both inflation and economic growth are highly interrelated.

== Fiscal policy ==
Fiscal policy consists in managing the national budget and its financing so as to influence economic activity. This entails the expansion or contraction of government expenditures related to specific government programs such as building roads or infrastructure, military expenditures and social welfare programs. It also includes the raising of taxes to finance government expenditures and the raising of debt (Treasuries in the U.S.) to bridge the gap (budget deficit) between revenues (tax receipts) and expenditures related to the implementation of government programs. Raising taxes and reducing the budget deficit is deemed to be a restrictive fiscal policy as it would reduce aggregate demand and slow down GDP growth. Lowering taxes and increasing the budget deficit is considered an expansive fiscal policy that would increase aggregate demand and stimulate the economy.

== History ==
The classification of some macroeconomic variables as instruments and some others as targets or objectives is originally due to Jan Tinbergen, who used these concepts in his books On the Theory of Economic Policy (1952) and Economic Policy: Principles and Design (1955).

== See also ==
- Central bank § Central bank operations
- Open market operation
