= Jan Sandee =

Dutch economist (1919–2011)

Jan Sandee (9 December 1919 in Rotterdam – 21 July 2011 in Boskoop) was a Dutch economist, consultant and Professor of Econometrics at the Netherlands School of Economics, Rotterdam, who headed the Econometric Institute from 1966 to 1971.

Sandee received his Engineering degree and was associated with the Statistics Netherlands late 1940s. In the 1950s he moved to the Dutch Bureau for Economic Policy Analysis. He was Visiting Professor at the Massachusetts Institute of Technology in 1963, and in 1965 was appointed Professor of Econometrics at the Netherlands School of Economics. In 1965 Sandee was elected fellow of the Econometric Society. From 1966 until 1971 he also was director of the Econometric Institute after Henri Theil, and succeeded by Willem Somermeyer.

== Publications ==
Sandee has published several notable articles. A selection:

- C.J. van Eijk & Sandee, J. (1959). Quantitative determination of an optimum economic policy. Econometrica: Journal of the Econometric Society, 1-13.
- Jan Sandee (1960). A Demonstration Planning Model for India.
- J.H.C. Lisman & Jan Sandee (1964). "Derivation of quarterly figures from annual data". Applied Statistics, 87-90.
- A S. Raj & Jan Sandee (1971) A Seasonal Food Grain Policy Model for India. Netherlands School of Economics, Econometric Institute.
- Peter van den Berg, Henk Don, Jan Sandee (1983) Kompas : kwartaalmodel voor prognose, analyse en simulatie. Centraal Planbureau, 's-Gravenhage.
