= Pieter Hennipman =

Dutch economist

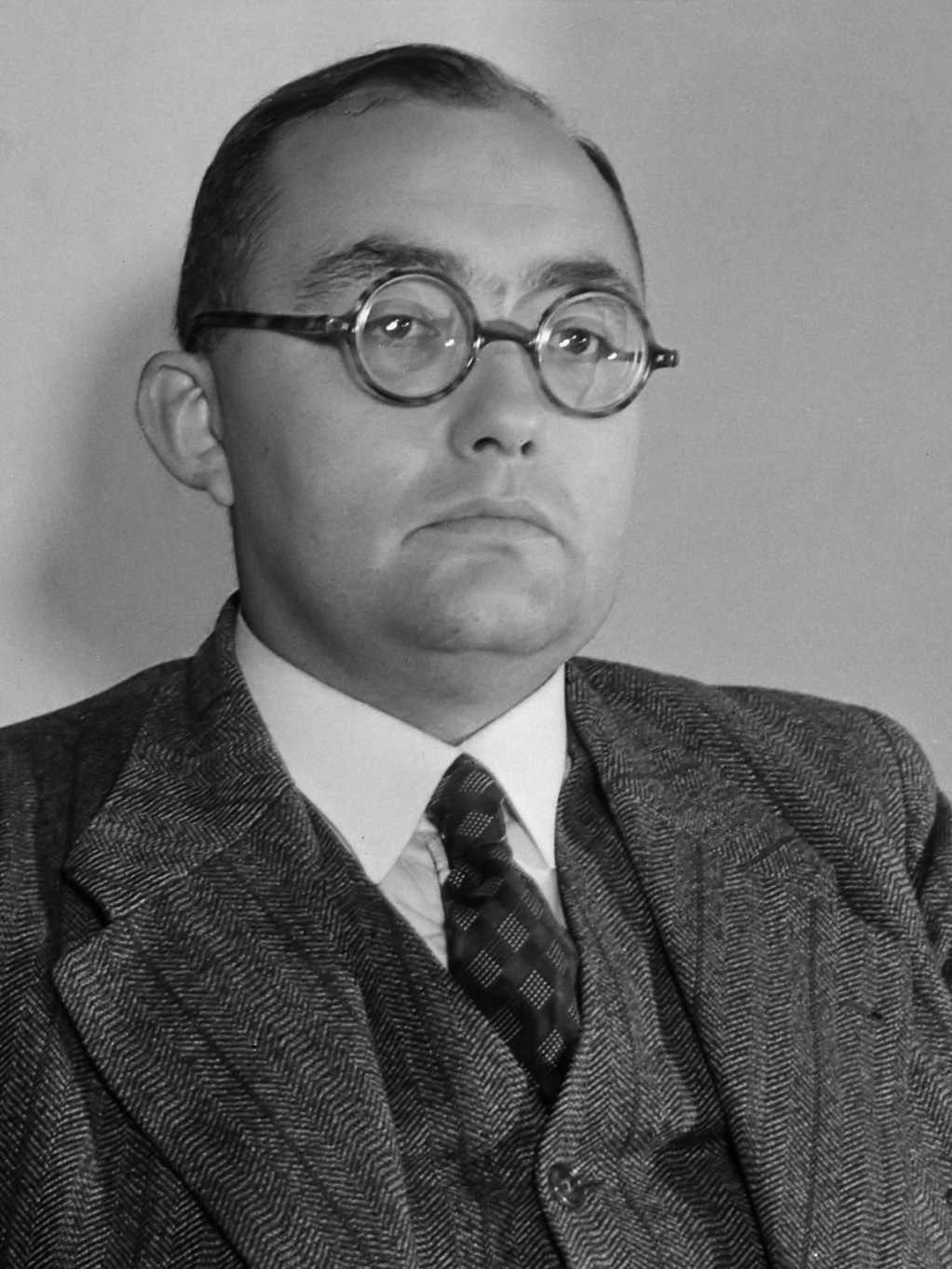
- Pieter Hennipman (1945)
- Born: 12 September 1911
- Died: 3 July 1994 (aged 82)

Academic background
- Education: University of Amsterdam

Pieter Hennipman (12 September 1911 – 3 July 1994) was a Dutch economist, Professor of Economics at the University of Amsterdam, who is considered the "leading Dutch economist of the post-war period."

== Biography ==
Born in Leiden, Hennipman received his MA in Economics at the University of Amsterdam in 1934 under Herman Frijda and Théodore Limperg, and in 1940 his PhD for the thesis "Economisch motief en economisch principe" (Economic motive and economic principle).

In 1938 he started his academic career as lecturer at the University of Amsterdam. After the war in 1945 he was appointed Professor of Economics as successor of Herman Frijda, who was murdered in Auschwitz. Among his doctoral students were Jan Pen (1950), Henri Theil (1951), Arnold Heertje (1960), and Joop van Santen (1968).

From 1946 to 1973 Hennipman was editor of the De Economist. In 1974 he married Elisabeth Eybers, with whom he stayed until his death.

== Work ==
In 1945 a significantly enlarged version of his thesis Economisch Motief en Economisch Principe (Economic Pattern and Economic Principle) was published. In this book he reckoned with the classic idea of the Homo economicus, which he called a "monstrous caricature," that should best not have been called into life. He argued that there is no economic purpose other than the pursuit of economic gratification using scarce alternative usable funds: "It follows that the economic objective in the sense of subjective theory that determined everyone, is missing specific content. It only covers those needs, that depend on the realization of scarce resources or of exchange operations."

Because needs differ per subject, prosperity in the broad sense is also a subjective concept and an empty (formal) concept in the sense that needs to be considered in the context of what the subject means by it. On this basis, the economy can not give prescriptions (or standards) for action.

This touched the essence of Hennipman's ideas which consequences can be found in his 1962 Doeleinden en criteria der economische politiek (Purposes and criteria of economic policy ), his 1966 De taak van de Mededingingspolitek (The role of the Competition policy), and appeared in his 1977 Welvaartstheorie en economische politiek, translated into English and published in 1995, entitled Welfare Economics and the Theory of Economic Policy.

His publications show that Hennipman builds on the ideas of the subjectivist Austrian School (including Eugen von Böhm-Bawerk), and Lionel Robbins' Essay on the Nature and Significance of Economic Science (1932).

In 1951 he contributed to the Congress of the International Economic Association with a lecture, entitled "Monopoly: Impediment or Stimulus to Economic Progress?," which was very well received worldwide. After his retirement in 1973 Hennipman focused in particular on the methodology, the history of economic theory and welfare theory. He knew how to develop purely verbal theory, where many others required algebra.

== Reception ==
The social impact of Hennipman's work has lagged behind to its theoretical quality. On the one hand he was hampered by his knowledge and perfectionism and published relatively little work. On the other hand, his work was made accessible in English relatively late.

Even today one can see that in economic policy some economists pretend to be able to describe what is good for the country. Their recommendations are often based on financial considerations. They may confessed that besides material (monetary) also non-material matters are in play, but in practical effects that are often left as they are. Hennipman favoured an approach in which all factors are involved insofar as they affect the satisfaction of needs of the subjects.

Jelle Zijlstra (1981) wrote about Hennipman, that in 1948 it had become obvious to him "how effortlessly Hennipman had found his niche among the great economists of his day with their rich experience, extensive knowledge and established reputations.”

== Publications ==
- Hennipman, Pieter. Economisch motief en economisch principe NV Noord-Hollandsche uitgevers maatschappij, 1945.
- Hennipman, Pieter, Hans van den Doel, and Arnold Heertje. Welvaartstheorie en economische politiek. Samsom, Alphen a/d Rijn 1977. Dedicated to the Belgian scholar M.A.G. van Meerhaeghe (p. 5).
- Hennipman, Pieter, Donald Anthony Walker, and Hans van den Doel. Welfare economics and the theory of economic policy. Edward Elgar Publishing, 1995.

Articles, a selection

- Hennipman, Pieter. "Some Notes on Pareto Optimality and Wicksellian Unanimity." Wandlungen in Wirtschaft und Gesellschaft. Die Wirtschafts-und Sozialwissenschaften vor neuen Aufgaben (1980): 399-410.
- Hennipman, Pieter. "The reasoning of a great methodologist: Mark Blaug on the nature of Paretian welfare economics." De Economist 140.4 (1992): 413-445.
