= Tinbergen Rule =

Economic policy rule

Tinbergen rule is an economic policy rule. It states that to achieve a number of goals, one must have at least as many independent policy instruments. Indeed, usually a single policy tool cannot be used to control two different objectives to their desired targets simultaneously. The rule was formulated by Jan Tinbergen.

For example, achieving both a target inflation rate and a target employment level generally requires at least two independent policy instruments. Typically, central banks adjust interest rates to achieve the desired inflation rate, and that can lead to an undesired rate of employment.

== Formal statement ==
According to Tinbergen, if there are n ultimate policy targets, there must be at least n independent instruments under the policymaker's control. If the number of instruments is smaller than the number of targets, some targets will not be achieved (except accidentally, because then adjusting some variable typically causes changes in others, too).

== Example ==
For example, to achieve three independent goals such as full employment, price stability, and external balance, at least three separate policy instruments – for instance fiscal policy, monetary policy and exchange-rate policy – are required.
