= Phelim Boyle =

Irish economist

- Born: 1941 (age 84–85); Northern Ireland
- Education: Queens University Belfast, Trinity College Dublin
- Scientific career
- Fields: Quantitive Finance
- Workplaces: Wilfrid Laurier University
- Academic advisors: Petros Florides

Phelim P. Boyle (born 1941), is an Irish economist and distinguished professor and actuary, and a pioneer of quantitative finance. He is best known for initiating the use of Monte Carlo methods in option pricing.

== Biography ==
Born on a farm in Lavey, County Londonderry, Northern Ireland, Phelim Boyle attended Dreenan School, Garron Tower and Queen's University Belfast (B.Sc.) He earned his M.Sc. in 1966 and PhD in 1970 applied mathematics, specialising in physics, from Trinity College, Dublin.

He is a professor of finance in the Laurier School of Business & Economics at Wilfrid Laurier University in Canada. Until June 2006 he held the J Page R Wadsworth Chair at the University of Waterloo. He is the founder of the Master of Quantitative Finance (MQF) program there.

Additional to his contributions to quantitative finance, he has published papers on actuarial science and demography. Together with his son, Feidhlim Boyle, he authored Derivatives: the Tools that Changed Finance. He continues to contribute in the area of quantitative finance.

He has been awarded the Centennial Gold Medal of the International Actuarial Association, and was the recipient of the IAFE/SunGard Financial Engineer of the Year in 2005. In 2019, he was elected as a Fellow of the Royal Society of Canada.

== Work ==
Boyle is best known for initiating the use of Monte Carlo methods in option pricing. Other well-known contributions in the area of quantitative finance include the use of the Trinomial method to price options. His seminal work on Monte Carlo methods in option pricing facilitated the 1980s explosion in the world of derivatives.

== Publications ==
Boyle has authored and co-authored numerous articles. A selection:

- Boyle, Phelim P. "Options: A Monte Carlo approach". Journal of Financial Economics 4.3 (1977): 323–338.
- Boyle, Phelim P. "A lattice framework for option pricing with two state variables". Journal of Financial and Quantitative Analysis 23.1 (1988): 1–12.
- Boyle, Phelim P., Jeremy Evnine, and Stephen Gibbs. "Numerical evaluation of multivariate contingent claims". Review of Financial Studies 2.2 (1989): 241–250.
- Boyle, Phelim P., and Ton Vorst. "Option replication in discrete time with transaction costs". The Journal of Finance 47.1 (1992): 271–293.
- Boyle, Phelim, Mark Broadie, and Paul Glasserman. "Monte Carlo methods for security pricing". Journal of economic dynamics and control 21.8 (1997): 1267–1321.

== See also ==
- List of University of Waterloo people
