= Philip Hans Franses =

Dutch economist (born 1963)

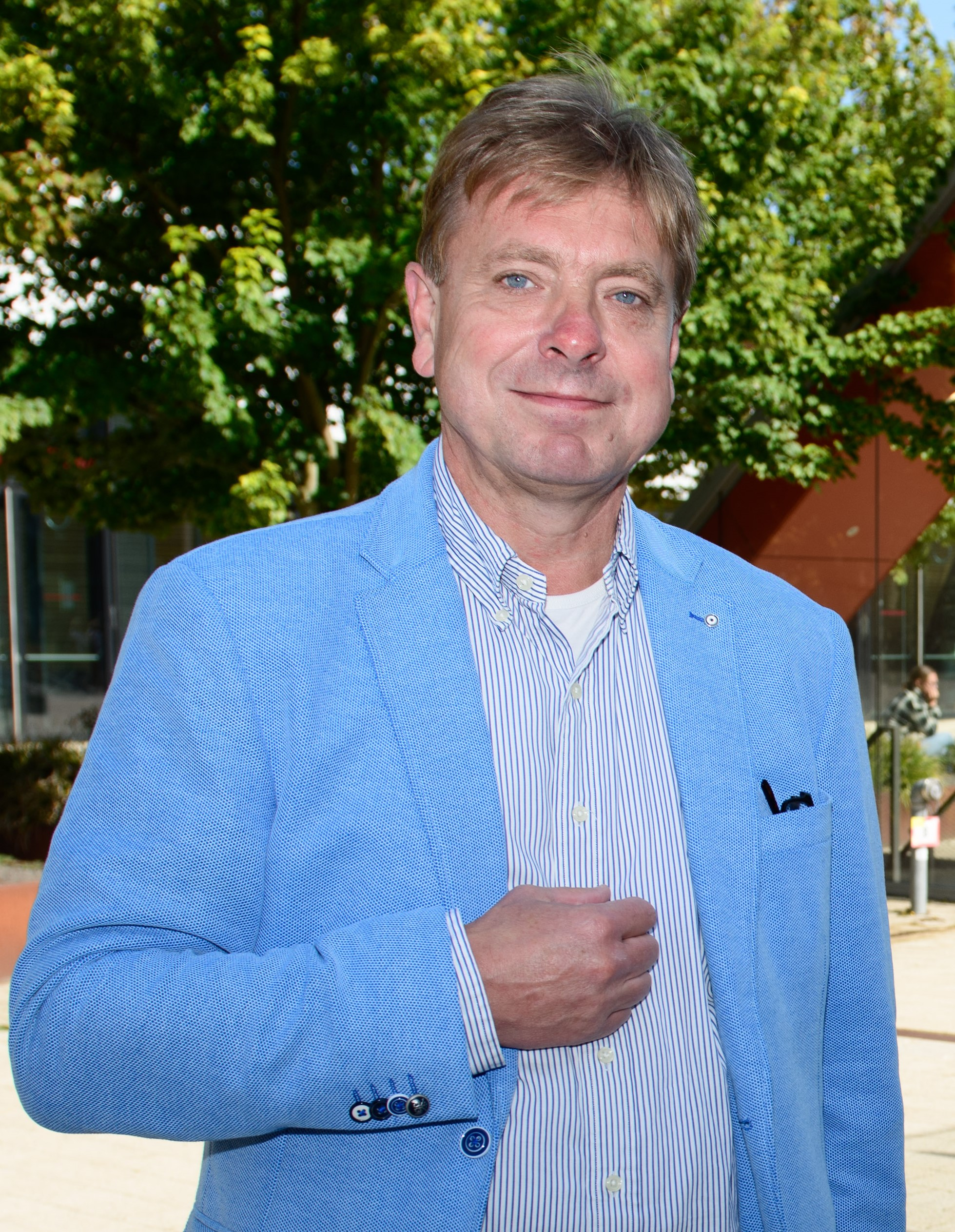

Philippus Henricus Benedictus Franciscus "Philip Hans" Franses (born 30 September 1963) is a Dutch economist and Professor of Applied Econometrics and Marketing Research at the Erasmus University Rotterdam, and former dean of the Erasmus School of Economics, especially known for his 1998 work on "Nonlinear Time Series Models in Empirical Finance."

== Biography ==
Born in Wageningen, Franses studied econometrics at the University of Groningen, graduated in 1987, and received his PhD in 1991 at Erasmus School of Economics of the Erasmus University Rotterdam with the thesis, entitled "Model selection and seasonality in time series" under supervision of Teun Kloek.

After graduation he started his academic career with a post-doc position as a Research Affiliate of the Royal Netherlands Academy of Arts and Sciences. In 1996 he became as associate professor at the Econometric Institute, and Director of Research at the Rotterdam Institute for Business Economic Studies. In 1998 he was appointed Endowed Professor of Applied Econometrics, and in 1999 he was appointed Professor of Marketing research at the Erasmus School of Economics of the Erasmus University Rotterdam. PhD students have been Albert Veenstra & Dick van Dijk (graduated in 1999); L.J.O. Lint, C.S. Bos & P.C. Verhoef (2001); J.-J.J. Jonker & J.E.M. van Nierop (2002); S.H.K. Wuyts (2003); J. Kippers (2004); S.D. Tsolakis & R.D. van Oest (2005); E.A. de Groot (2006); B.L.K. Vroomen; S. Knapp (2007); M.C. Non (2008); M. van Diepen, R. Segers & A. van Dijk (2009).

From 2004 to 2006 he was Director of the Econometric Institute as successor of Herman K. van Dijk, and was succeeded by Albert Wagelmans. Since 2006 Franses is Dean of the Erasmus School of Economics.

In 2011 Franses is elected member of the Royal Netherlands Academy of Arts and Sciences. In 2012 he received an honorary doctorate from Chiang Mai University in Thailand.

== Work ==
Franses' research interests are in the field of the "development of new models that enable more accurate forecasts with a specific focus on seasonal time series and marketing metrics. His interests also include economic growth and business cycles as well as the Euro."

=== Time series models for business and economic forecasting, 1998 ===
In the Preface of "Time series models for business and economic forecasting" (1998) Franses started explaining, that "the econometric analysis of economic and business time series is a major field of research and application. The last few decades have witnessed an increasing interest in both theoretical and empirical developments in constructing time series models and in their important application in forecasting."

In this work these developments are being researched. The Cambridge catalogue summarized, that "the early parts of the book focus on the typical features of time series data in business and economics. Part III is concerned with the discussion of some important concepts in time series analysis, the discussion focuses on the techniques which can be readily applied in practice. Parts IV-VIII suggest different modeling methods and model structures. Part IX extends the concepts in chapter three to multivariate time series. Part X examines common aspects across time series."

=== Nonlinear Time Series Models in Empirical Finance, 1998 ===
Franses' most familiar work is Nonlinear Time Series Models in Empirical Finance, published in 1998, and co-authored by his former PhD student Dick van Dijk. In its introduction, the books aim and content is summarized:

"This book deals with the empirical analysis of financial time series with an explicit focus on, first, describing the data in order to obtain insights into their dynamic patterns and, second, out-of-sample forecasting. We restrict attention to modelling and forecasting the conditional mean and the conditional variance of such series – or, in other words, the return and risk of financial assets. As documented in detail below, financial time series display typical nonlinear characteristics. Important examples of those features are the occasional presence of (sequences of) aberrant observations and the plausible existence of regimes within which returns and volatility display different dynamic behaviour. We therefore choose to consider only nonlinear models in substantial detail, in contrast to Mills (1999), where linear models are also considered. Financial theory does not provide many motivations for nonlinear models, but we believe that the data themselves are quite informative..."

=== Econometric methods with applications in business and economics, 2004 ===
In "Econometric methods with applications in business and economics" (2004) Christiaan Heij et al. stated, that "nowadays applied work in business and economics requires a solid understanding of econometric methods to support decision-making."

This textbook takes a learning by doing approach, and "covers basic econometric methods (statistics, simple and multiple regression, nonlinear regression, maximum likelihood, and generalized method of moments), and addresses the creative process of model building with due attention to diagnostic testing and model improvement. Its last part is devoted to two major application areas: the econometrics of choice data (logit and probit, multinomial and ordered choice, truncated and censored data, and duration data) and the econometrics of time series data (univariate time series, trends, volatility, vector autoregressions, and a brief discussion of SUR models, panel data, and simultaneous equations)."

== Publications ==
Franses has authored and co-authored over 300 scientific articles and papers, and some books. Books:

- Franses, Philip Hans. Periodicity and stochastic trends in economic time series. OUP Catalogue (1996).
- Franses, Philip Hans. Time series models for business and economic forecasting. Cambridge University Press, 1998; 1999; 2000; 2001. Translation into Chinese, 2003.
- Franses, Philip Hans, and Dick Van Dijk. Non-linear time series models in empirical finance. Cambridge University Press, 2000.
- Franses, Philip Hans, and Richard Paap. Quantitative models in marketing research. Cambridge University Press, 2001.
- Heij, C., De Boer, P., Franses, P. H., Kloek, T., & Van Dijk, H. K. (2004). Econometric methods with applications in business and economics. Oxford University Press.

Articles, a selection:

- Franses, Philip Hans, and Niels Haldrup. "The effects of additive outliers on tests for unit roots and cointegration." Journal of Business & Economic Statistics 12.4 (1994): 471–478.
- Boswijk, H. Peter, and Philip Hans Franses. "Periodic cointegration: Representation and inference." The review of economics and statistics (1995): 436–454.
- Franses, Philip Hans, and Hendrik Ghijsels. "Additive outliers, GARCH and forecasting volatility." International Journal of Forecasting 15.1 (1999): 1–9.
- Hobijn, Bart, and Philip Hans Franses. "Asymptotically perfect and relative convergence of productivity." Journal of Applied Econometrics 15.1 (2000): 59–81.
- Dijk, Dick van, Timo Teräsvirta, and Philip Hans Franses. "Smooth transition autoregressive models—a survey of recent developments." Econometric Reviews 21.1 (2002): 1-47.
- Verhoef, Peter C., Philip Hans Franses, and Janny C. Hoekstra. "The effect of relational constructs on customer referrals and number of services purchased from a multiservice provider: does age of relationship matter?." Journal of the Academy of Marketing Science 30.3 (2002): 202–216.
- Franses, Philip Hans. "On the use of econometric models for policy simulation in marketing." Journal of Marketing Research 42.1 (2005): 4-14.
- Van Nierop, Erjen, Dennis Fok, and Philip Hans Franses. "Interaction between shelf layout and marketing effectiveness and its impact on optimizing shelf arrangements." Marketing Science 27.6 (2008): 1065–1082.
