= Joern Meissner =

German academic

Joern Meissner (born c. 1970) is a German academic, business consultant, entrepreneur and Professor of Supply Chain Management & Pricing Strategy at Kühne Logistics University in Hamburg.

== Biography ==
Meissner received MA in Business Management in 1997 at the University of Hamburg, and his Ph.D. in Management Science in 2005 from the Columbia Business School under the supervision of Professors Awi Federgruen and Costis Maglaras.

He is a current lecturer in the Management Science Department at the Lancaster University Management School and also lectures at the University of Hamburg and the University of Manheim, and has taught at Handelshochschule Leipzig (the Leipzig Graduate School of Management).

Meisser hold the position of Professor of Supply Chain Management & Pricing Strategy at Kuehne Logistics University in Hamburg. Prof. Meissner is active in the area of Supply Chain Management, Dynamic Pricing, and Revenue Management.

He is the founder of Manhattan Review, a multi-national test prep, MBA admissions consulting, and career training company.

== Work ==
Meissner has been published in various journals including Manufacturing and Service Operations Management (MSOM); Operations Research; Naval Research Logistics; European Journal of Operational Research, and written several book chapters.

He has also been featured in BusinessWeek for Manhattan Review’s Communications Bootcamp with Columbia Business School. Newsweek, The Independent, The Times, Handelsblatt and Frankfurt Allgemeine Zeitung have also quoted Prof. Meissner regarding the GMAT and MBA admissions.

His paper “Dynamic pricing strategies for multiproduct revenue management problem," jointly written with Costis Maglaras, was a finalist in the MSOM Best Paper award 2009. He frequently advises companies ranging from Fortune 500 companies to emerging start-ups on various issues related to his research.

== Publications ==
- Maglaras, Constantinos, and Joern Meissner. "Dynamic pricing strategies for multiproduct revenue management problems." Manufacturing & Service Operations Management 8.2 (2006): 136-148.
- Federgruen, Awi, Joern Meissner, and Michal Tzur. "Progressive interval heuristics for multi-item capacitated lot-sizing problems." Operations Research 55.3 (2007): 490-502.
- Meissner, Joern, and Arne Strauss. "Network revenue management with inventory-sensitive bid prices and customer choice." European Journal of Operational Research 216.2 (2012): 459-468.
