= Gijs de Leve =

Dutch mathematician and operations researcher

Gijsbert "Gijs" de Leve (15 August 1926 – 19 November 2009) was a Dutch mathematician and operations researcher, known for his work on Markov decision process. Gijs de Leve is considered the founder of operations research in the Netherlands.

== Biography ==
Born in Amsterdam, De Leve received his MA in Mathematics and Physics in 1954 at the University of Amsterdam. There he also received his PhD cum laude in 1964 for the thesis Generalized Markovian decision processes, advised by Jan Hemelrijk and Johannes Runnenburg.

De Leve was appointed professor in operations research, in particular management scientific applications, at the University of Amsterdam in 1972. Among his doctorate students were Henk Tijms (1972), Alexander Rinnooy Kan (1976), Jan Karel Lenstra (1976), P. Weeda (1978), Awi Federgruen (1978), Antoon Kolen (1982), Roy Jonker (1986), Anton Volgenant (1987), Jeroen de Kort (1992), Erik H.J. van der Sluis (1993), Nanda Piersma (1993) and Cees Duin (1994). He retired from the University of Amsterdam on 1 September 1991.

In honor of De Leve, in 1997 the Gijs de Leve prize was initiated for the best PhD thesis in the area of mathematics of operations research.

== Publications ==
- Overzicht van een aantal artikelen over "Operations Research". Volume 1. G. de Leve, Jacobus Kriens, 1955.
- Enige statistische aspecten van de factoranalyse. G. de Leve, 1956
- Operations research: Inleidende voorbeelden. Hoofdstuk 1. J. Kriens, G. de Leve, 1959
- Oriënterende cursus mathematische besliskunde. G. de Leve, Stichting Mathematisch Centrum. Afdeling Mathematische Statistiek, 1962.
- Generalized Markovian decision processes – Deel 2. G. de Leve, 1964
- Generalized Markovian Decision Processes: Model and method. Gijs de Leve, 1964
- Inleiding in de besliskunde. G. de Leve, J.C. van Dalen, Stichting Mathematisch Centrum, 1970

Articles, a selection

- Leve, Gijsbert. "Wie beslist er eigenlijk*." Statistica Neerlandica 20.2 (1966): 155–169.
- De Leve, Gijsbert, Awi Federgruen, and Hendrik C. Tijms. "A general Markov decision method I: model and techniques." Advances in Applied Probability (1977): 296–315.
- Federgruen, A. "Some approximation approaches in large-scale." Twenty-five years of operations research in the Netherlands: papers dedicated to Gijs de Leve 70 (1989): 35.
