= Henri Theil =

Dutch econometrician (1924–2000)

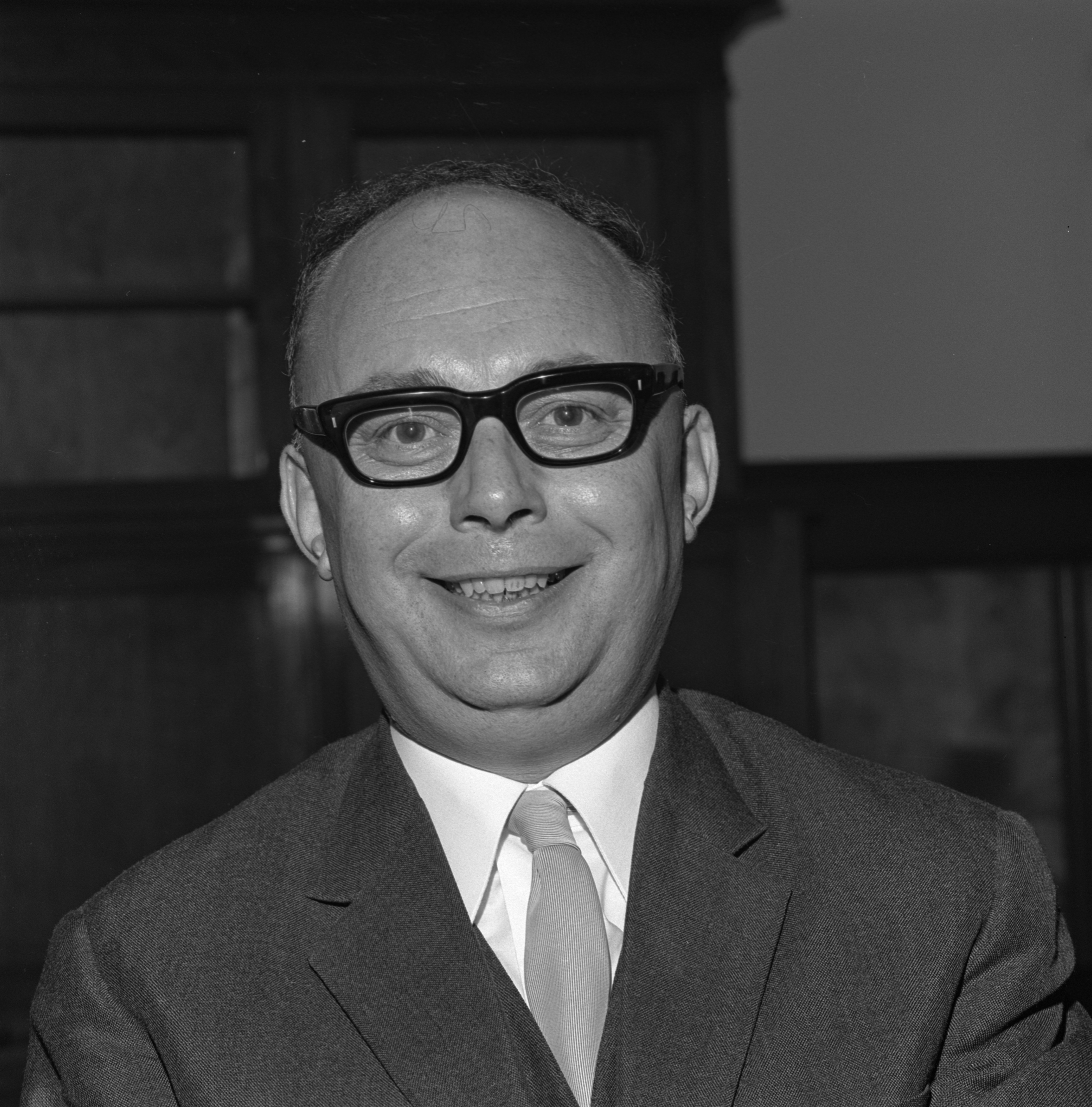
- prof. dr. H. Theil, 1966
- Born: October 13, 1924
- Died: August 20, 2000 (aged 75)

Academic background
- Education: Utrecht University
- Doctoral advisor: Pieter Hennipman; Pieter de Wolff
- Influences: Jan Tinbergen

Academic work
- Discipline: Econometrics

Henri (Hans) Theil (October 13, 1924 – August 20, 2000) was a Dutch econometrician and professor at the Netherlands School of Economics in Rotterdam, known for his contributions to the field of econometrics.

== Biography ==
Born in Amsterdam, Theil started to study mathematics and physics at Utrecht University in 1942. Later in World War II he was arrested and was imprisoned in Vught. After the war he started to study economics at the Gemeente-Universiteit Amsterdam, where in 1951 he received his PhD under Pieter Hennipman.

After graduation Theil started working as researcher for the Bureau for Economic Policy Analysis under Jan Tinbergen. In 1953 he was appointed Professor of Econometrics at the Netherlands School of Economics as successor of Jan Tinbergen. Here he founded the Econometric Institute in 1956, which he directed for ten years and was then succeeded by Jan Sandee. He also wrote Principles of Econometrics. In 1966 he moved to the United States, where he was appointed Professor of Econometrics and director of the Center for Mathematical Studies in Business and Economics at the University of Chicago. He also taught at the University of Florida.

Theil was awarded honorary degrees by the University of Chicago in 1964, by the Vrije Universiteit Brussel in 1973 and by the Erasmus University Rotterdam in 1983. In 1968 he was elected as a Fellow of the American Statistical Association. In 1980 he became correspondent of the Royal Netherlands Academy of Arts and Sciences.

== Work ==
Theil is best known for his invention of the widely used two-stage least squares (2SLS) method in 1953. This estimation technique greatly simplified estimation of simultaneous equation models of the economy and came into widespread use for this purpose.

He is also known for the Theil index, a measure of entropy, which belongs to the class of Kolm-Indices and is used as an inequality indicator in econometrics. He is also responsible for the Theil–Sen estimator for robust regression. Theil's archives are kept at Hope College.

== Publications ==
Theil published a series of books and numerous articles. Books:

- Theil, H. (1954), Linear aggregation of economic relations. Amsterdam. North-Holland Publishing Company.
- Theil, H. (1958), Economic forecasts and policy. Assisted by J.S. Cramer, H. Moerman, and A. Russchen.
- Theil, H.; Kloek, T. (1960), "The operational implications of imperfect models", in Arrow, Kenneth J.; Karlin, Samuel; Suppes, Patrick (eds.), Mathematical models in the social sciences, 1959: Proceedings of the first Stanford symposium, Stanford mathematical studies in the social sciences, IV, Stanford, California: Stanford University Press, pp. 105–128, ISBN 9780804700214.
- Theil, H. (1965), Operations research and quantitative economics. With John C. G. Boot and Teun Kloek
- Theil, H. (1966), Applied economic forecasting. With G.A.C. Beerens, C.B. Tilanus, and C.G. De Leeuw . Vol. 4. Amsterdam: North-Holland Publishing Company.
- Theil, H. (1967), Economics and information theory. Vol. 7. Amsterdam: North-Holland.
- Theil, H. (1971), Principles of Econometrics. Vol. 1. New York: Wiley.
- Theil, H. (1972), Statistical decomposition analysis: With applications in the social and administrative sciences. Amsterdam: North-Holland Publishing Company.
- Theil, H. (1989), International evidence on consumption patterns. With Ching-Fan Chung and James L. Seale.

About Theil

- Baldev Raj, J. Koerts eds. (1992) Henri Theil's Contributions to Economics and Econometrics: Econometric theory and methodology. Vol. I. Springer.
- Kloek, Teun (2001). "Obituary: Henri Theil, 1924–2000". Statistica Neerlandica. 55 (3): 263–269. doi:10.1111/1467-9574.00169.

== See also ==
- Economic forecasting
