= Jan Karel Lenstra =

Dutch mathematician and operations researcher

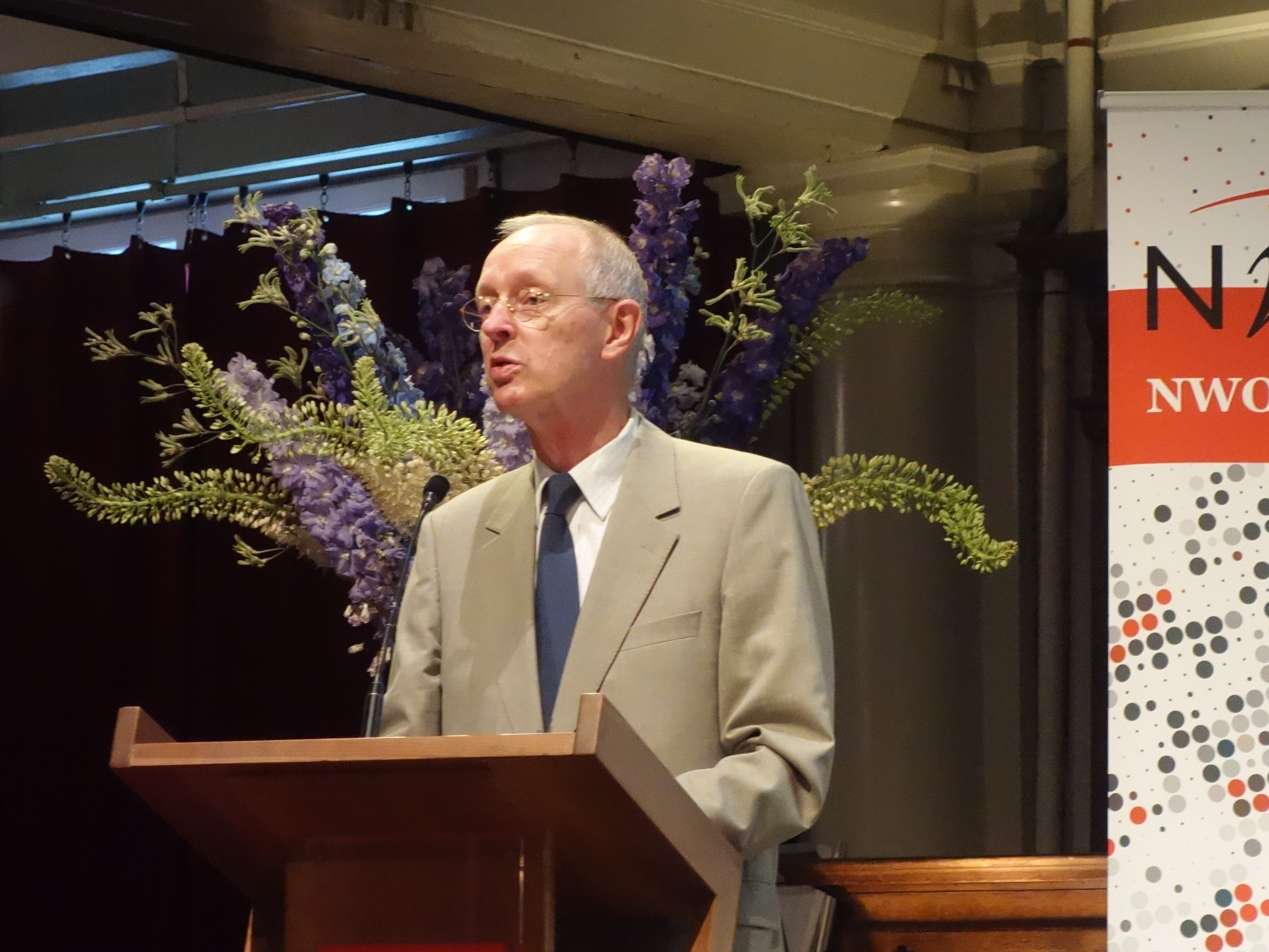
- Jan Karel Lenstra (2017)
- Born: December 19, 1947 (age 78); Zaandam
- Education: University of Amsterdam
- Spouse: Karen Aardal
- Relatives: Arjen Lenstra; Hendrik Lenstra
- Awards: EURO Gold Medal (1997); INFORMS Fellow (2004); Order of the Netherlands Lion (2011)
- Scientific career
- Fields: Operations research
- Institutions: Centrum Wiskunde & Informatica; Eindhoven University of Technology; Georgia Tech
- Thesis: Sequencing by Enumerative Methods (1976)
- Doctoral advisor: Gijsbert de Leve
- Doctoral students: Antoon Kolen; Leen Stougie; Martin Savelsbergh; Gerard Kindervater; Steef van de Velde; Marjan van den Akker; Arjen Vestjens; Petra Schuurman

Jan Karel Lenstra (born 19 December 1947, in Zaandam) is a Dutch mathematician and operations researcher, known for his work on scheduling problems, the travelling salesman problem, complexity, approximation, and local search.

Lenstra received his Ph.D. from the University of Amsterdam in 1976, advised by Gijsbert de Leve. He then became a researcher at the Centrum Wiskunde & Informatica (CWI), where he remained until 1989. After taking positions at the Eindhoven University of Technology (where he became Dean of the Faculty of Mathematics and Computer Science) and the Georgia Institute of Technology, he returned to CWI as its director in 2003. He stepped down in 2011, and at that time became a CWI Fellow. He was editor-in-chief of Mathematics of Operations Research from 1993 to 1998, and of Operations Research Letters from 2002 to 2021.

Lenstra became an INFORMS Fellow in 2004. In 1997, he was awarded the EURO Gold Medal, the highest distinction within Operations Research in Europe. In 2011, he was made a Knight of the Order of the Netherlands Lion, and the CWI organized a symposium in his honor.

Lenstra was chair of the Mathematical Optimization Society, of the Royal Dutch Mathematical Society, and of advisory committees of the Royal Netherlands Academy of Arts and Sciences on mathematics in primary education and on digital literacy in secondary education. He chaired the committees for the Spinoza Prize and the Stevin Prize of the Dutch Science Council.

Lenstra is the brother of Arjen Lenstra, Andries Lenstra, and Hendrik Lenstra, all of whom are also mathematicians. His daughter Catrien (1976) is CEO of the City of Amsterdam. He is married to Karen Aardal, who is professor of optimization at Delft University of Technology. They have two children, Lisa (1999) and Jacob (2003).

== Publications ==
- Jan Karel Lenstra // DBLP, Universität Trier
- Peter Brucker, Jan Karel Lenstra, Alexander H.G. Rinnooy Kan. Complexity of machine scheduling problems. Annals of Discrete Mathematics 1 (1977), 343–362.
- Ronald L. Graham, Eugene L. Lawler, Jan Karel Lenstra, Alexander H.G. Rinnooy Kan. Optimization and approximation in deterministic sequencing and scheduling; a survey. Annals of Discrete Mathematics 5 (1979), 287–326.
- J. Blazewicz, Jan Karel Lenstra, Alexander H.G. Rinnooy Kan. Scheduling subject to resource constraints; classification and complexity. Discrete Applied Mathematics 5 (1983), 11–24.
- Eugene L. Lawler, Jan Karel Lenstra, Alexander H.G. Rinnooy Kan, David B. Shmoys (eds.). The traveling salesman problem; a guided tour of combinatorial optimization, Wiley, Chichester (1985).
- Jan Karel Lenstra, David B. Shmoys, Éva Tardos. Approximation algorithms for scheduling unrelated parallel machines. Mathematical Programming 46 (1990), 259–271.
- Peter J. M. van Laarhoven, Emile H. L. Aarts, Jan Karel Lenstra. - Job Shop Scheduling by Simulated Annealing (info) // Operations Research, 40 (1992), pp. 113-125.
- Eugene L. Lawler, Jan Karel Lenstra, Alexander H.G. Rinnooy Kan, David B. Shmoys. Sequencing and scheduling; algorithms and complexity. S.C. Graves, A.H.G. Rinnooy Kan, P. Zipkin (eds.). Handbooks in operations research and management science; volume 4; logistics of production and inventory, North-Holland, Amsterdam (1993), 445–522.
- Emile H. L. Aarts, Peter J. M. van Laarhoven, Jan Karel Lenstra, Nico L. J. Ulder: A Computational Study of Local Search Algorithms for Job Shop Scheduling. // INFORMS Journal on Computing 6(2): 118-125 (1994) (dblp)
- Emile H.L. Aarts, Jan Karel Lenstra. Local search in combinatorial optimization, Wiley, Chichester (1997)
- Jan Karel Lenstra, David B. Shmoys. elementsofscheduling.nl . (This website presents fragments of an unfinished book on machine scheduling.)

== Sources ==
- Album Academicum (website University of Amsterdam)
