= Stan van Hoesel =

Dutch mathematician

Constantinus P. M. (Stan) van Hoesel (born 1961) is a Dutch mathematician, and Professor of Operations Research at the Maastricht University, and head of its Quantitative Economics Group, known for his work on mathematical optimization.

== Life and work ==
Born in Tilburg, Stan obtained his Msc in mathematics at the Eindhoven University of Technology in 1986, and in 1991 his PhD at the Erasmus University Rotterdam under Alexander H. G. Rinnooy Kan and Antoon Kolen with the thesis, entitled "Models and Algorithms for Single-Item Lot Sizing Problems."

In 1987 Van Hoesel started his academic career at the Erasmus University Rotterdam as assistant professor, and continued his research in mathematical modelling of problems and solutions for production planning. After his graduation he moved to the Eindhoven University of Technology, and later to the Maastricht University, where in 2001 he was appointed professor of operations research. His PhD students were at the Eindhoven University of Technology Cleola van Eijl (graduated in 1996); and at the Maastricht University Arie Koster (graduated in 1999), Reinder Lok (2007), and Bert Marchal (2012).

Van Hoesel's research interests are in the field of "optimisation problems in the business world. He uses techniques from mathematics and computer sciences to discover the most efficient solution for various planning problems. Topics related to his research are telecommunications and traffic, where he looks at the migration of various types of networks and the sequence in which customers are served in order to process all orders as quickly as possible."

== Selected publications ==
- Stan Van Hoesel. Models and Algorithms for Single-Item Lot Sizing Problems, PhD thesis Erasmus University Rotterdam.

Articles, a selection:

- Wagelmans, Albert, Stan Van Hoesel, and Antoon Kolen. "Economic lot sizing: an O (n log n) algorithm that runs in linear time in the Wagner-Whitin case." Operations Research 40.1-Supplement - 1 (1992): pp. 145–156.
- Zwaneveld, P. J., Kroon, L. G., Romeijn, H. E., Salomon, M., Dauzere-Péres, S., Van Hoesel, S. P., & Ambergen, H. W. (1996). "Routing trains through railway stations: Model formulation and algorithms." Transportation science, 30(3), 181–194. doi:10.1287/trsc.30.3.181.
- CA Koster, Arie M., Hans L. Bodlaender, and Stan PM Van Hoesel. "Treewidth: computational experiments." Electronic Notes in Discrete Mathematics 8 (2001): 54–57. doi:10.1016/S1571-0653(05)80078-2.
- Zwaneveld, Peter J., Leo G. Kroon, and Stan PM Van Hoesel. "Routing trains through a railway station based on a node packing model." European Journal of Operational Research 128.1 (2001): 14–33. doi:10.1016/S0377-2217(00)00087-4.
- Aardal, K. I., Van Hoesel, S. P., Koster, A. M., Mannino, C., & Sassano, A. (2007). "Models and solution techniques for frequency assignment problems." Annals of Operations Research, 153(1), 79-129.
