= Hans van den Doel (People's Party for Freedom and Democracy) =

Dutch politician

Mayor of Anna Paulowna
- In office June 1, 2009 – September 22, 2010
- Preceded by: Joyce Sylvester
- Succeeded by: Arnoud-Jan Pennink

Personal details
- Born: January 18, 1955 Alkmaar, Netherlands
- Died: September 22, 2010 (aged 55) Andijk, Netherlands
- Party: People's Party for Freedom and Democracy
- Occupation: Politician

Hans van den Doel (January 18, 1955 – September 22, 2010) was a Dutch politician of the People's Party for Freedom and Democracy (VVD). He served as Mayor of Anna Paulowna from June 1, 2009 until his death from pancreatic cancer on September 22, 2010.
