= Dirk Bezemer =

Dutch economist

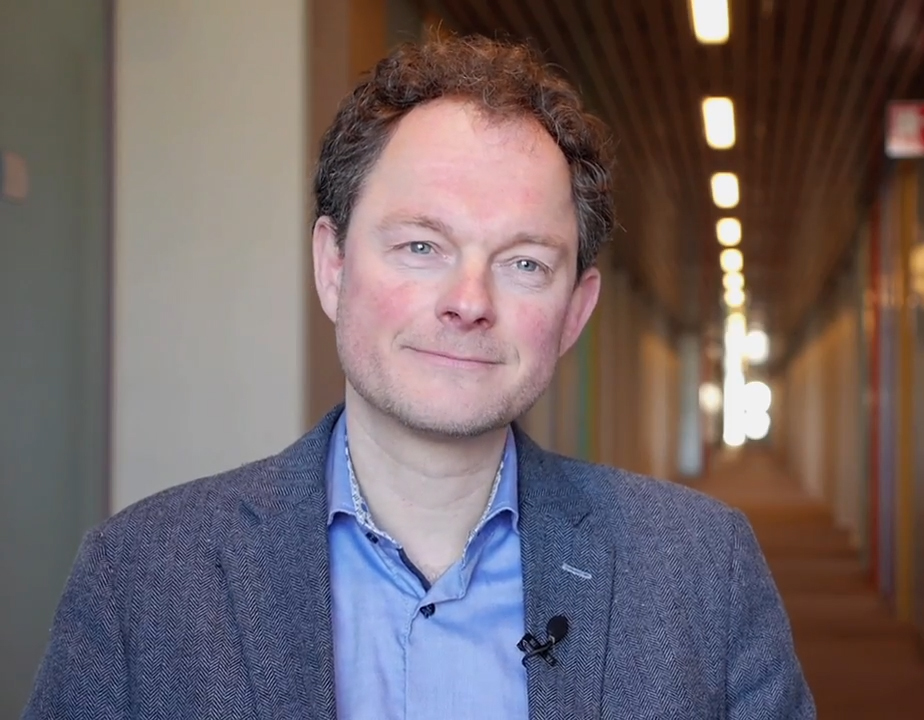
- Dirk Bezemer in 2016
- Born: 1971 (age 54–55)
- Title: Professor

Academic background
- Education: Wageningen University: M.Sc. in Economics (1995); University of Amsterdam & Tinbergen Institute: Ph.D. in Economics (2001)

Academic work
- Discipline: Economics and business
- Institutions: Rijksuniversiteit Groningen

Dirk Bezemer (born 1971) is a Dutch economist who is a professor at the Faculty of Economics and Business of the Rijksuniversiteit Groningen. He studied at Wageningen University (M.Sc. in Economics (1995)) and University of Amsterdam & Tinbergen Institute (Ph.D. in Economics (2001)). His topics of expertise include the financial sector, credit creation, credit cycles, monetary policy, and the cause of economic crises. Bezemer provides commentary at the Centre for Economic Policy Research and De Groene Amsterdammer. In a September 2009 opinion piece in the Financial Times he wrote that a dozen economists whom he listed had predicted the 2008 financial crisis but were ignored.
