= Herman K. van Dijk =

Dutch economist (1946–2025)

Herman Koene van Dijk (1946 – 24 January 2025) was a Dutch economist who was a consultant at the Research Department of Norges Bank and Professor Emeritus at the Econometric Institute of the Erasmus University Rotterdam, known for his contributions in the field of Bayesian analysis.

== Life and career ==
Van Dijk received his BA in Economics in 1967 and his Doctorandus degree in Economics in 1969 both at the University of Groningen. He went to the States, where he received his MA in Economics in 1972 from the State University of New York at Buffalo. Back in The Netherlands he received his PhD in Econometrics in 1984 from the Erasmus University Rotterdam for the thesis "Posterior analysis of econometric models using Monte Carlo integration."

He started in 1972 his academic career at the Econometric Institute at the Erasmus University Rotterdam, where in 1993 he was appointed Professor of Econometrics at the Econometric Institute. From 1992 to 1998 he was Director of the Tinbergen Institute, and later from 2008 to 2010. From 1998 to 2003 he was Director of the Econometric Institute.

Dijk was a Visiting Professor at Cambridge University, the Catholic University of Louvain, Harvard University, Duke University, Cornell University, and the University of New South Wales. He was referent, editor and on the editorial board of journals and other publications in the field of econometrics. He chaired and co-chaired many conferences in the field. He died on 24 January 2025.

=== Awards and honours ===
- Invited paper : Challenges and Opportunities for 21st Century Bayesian Econometricians appeared in Nonlinear Dynamics and Econometrics.
- Recipient of the 2022 Zellner medal by the International Society of Bayesian Analysis.
- Elected Fellow of International Association of Applied Econometrics 2018.
- Knight in the Order of the Lion of the Netherlands, by H.M. The King, 2017.
- Distinguished author of Journal of Applied Econometrics, 2017.
- Elected Member of the International Statistical Institute, 2014.
- Elected Fellow of the International Society of Bayesian Analysis, 2012.
- Elected Senior Fellow at the Rimini Center for Economic Analysis, 2012.
- Recipient of the Tinbergen Institute Medal 2011.
- Recipient of Ad Fontes medal awarded by the Board of Erasmus University Rotterdam, 2010.
- Listed in the Econometricians Hall of Fame amongst top ten European econometricians (source: Econometric Theory 14, 1998, also listed in ET, 2003 and 2007).
- Elected Honorary Fellow of the Tinbergen Institute, 2005.
- Elected Fellow of Journal of Econometrics, 2001.
- Visiting fellowship: Corpus Christi Cambridge UK, 2001.
- Recipient of Fulbright Scholarship, 1985 at Harvard University.
- Recipient of Nato-Science Scholarship, 1985 at Harvard University.
- Recipient of the L.J. Savage Memorial Award for the doctoral dissertation, 1986.

== Work ==
Van Dijk's research interests are in the field of "Bayesian inference using simulation techniques, time series econometrics, neural networks, and income distributions."

=== Posterior analysis of econometric models using Monte Carlo integration, 1984 ===
The 1984 "Posterior analysis of econometric models using Monte Carlo integration," was written as doctoral dissertation at the Erasmus University Rotterdam. In this work Van Dijk discussed "the use of Monte Carlo integration methods for the computation of the multivariate integrals that are defined in the posterior moments and densities of the parameters of interest of econometric models."

=== Econometric methods with applications in business and economics, 2004 ===
In "Econometric methods with applications in business and economics" (2004) Christiaan Heij et al. stated, that "nowadays applied work in business and economics requires a solid understanding of econometric methods to support decision-making."

This textbook takes a learning by doing approach, and "covers basic econometric methods (statistics, simple and multiple regression, nonlinear regression, maximum likelihood, and generalized method of moments), and addresses the creative process of model building with due attention to diagnostic testing and model improvement. Its last part is devoted to two major application areas: the econometrics of choice data (logit and probit, multinomial and ordered choice, truncated and censored data, and duration data) and the econometrics of time series data (univariate time series, trends, volatility, vector autoregressions, and a brief discussion of SUR models, panel data, and simultaneous equations)."

== Publications ==
Van Dijk has authored and co-authored over 180 papers, reports and books. Books, a selection:

- Van Dijk, H. K. Posterior analysis of econometric models using Monte Carlo integration. Doctoral dissertation. Rotterdam : Erasmus Universiteit, 1984.
- Heij, C., De Boer, P., Franses, P. H., Kloek, T., & Van Dijk, H. K. (2004). Econometric methods with applications in business and economics. Oxford University Press.

Articles, a selection:

- Kloek, Teun, and Herman K. Van Dijk. "Bayesian estimates of equation system parameters: an application of integration by Monte Carlo." Econometrica: Journal of the Econometric Society (1978): 1-19.
- Schotman, Peter C., and Herman K. Van Dijk. "On Bayesian routes to unit roots." Journal of Applied Econometrics 6.4 (1991): 387–401.
- Kleibergen, Frank, and Herman K. Van Dijk. "On the shape of the likelihood/posterior in cointegration models." Econometric Theory 10 (1994): 514–551.
- Paap, Richard, and Herman K. Van Dijk. "Distribution and mobility of wealth of nations." European Economic Review 42.7 (1998): 1269–1293.
- Hoogerheide, Lennart, Opschoor, Anne and Herman K. Van Dijk. "A class of adaptive importance sampling weighted EM algorithms for efficient and robust posterior and predictive simulation.." Journal of Econometrics 171 (2012): 101-120.
