= Teun Kloek =

Dutch economist (born 1934)

Teunis (Teun) Kloek
- Born: 15 August 1934 (age 92); Leerbroek

Academic background
- Education: Erasmus Universiteit Rotterdam

Academic work
- Discipline: Econometrics
- Institutions: Erasmus Universiteit Rotterdam
- Website: Information at IDEAS / RePEc

Teunis (Teun) Kloek (born 1934) is a Dutch economist and emeritus Professor of Econometrics at the Erasmus Universiteit Rotterdam. His research interests centered on econometric methods and their applications, especially nonparametric and robust methods in econometrics.

== Biography ==
Kloek received his PhD in 1966 from the Erasmus University Rotterdam for the thesis "Indexcijfers : enige methodologische aspecten" (Index : some methodological aspects) under supervision of Henri Theil.

Kloek was appointed Professor of Econometrics at the Erasmus Universiteit Rotterdam in 1967. With Alexander Rinnooy Kan and later Harm Bart, he was co-director of the Econometric Institute from 1982 to 1992 as successor of Willem Somermeyer and was succeeded by Ton Vorst. Since his retirement in 1997 Kloek has been affiliated with the Tinbergen Institute.

Some of Kloek's most notable doctoral students were Herman K. van Dijk (1984) and Philip Hans Franses (1991).

Kloek was elected fellow of the Econometric Society in 1978 and of the Journal of Econometrics, and honorary fellow of the Tinbergen Institute.

== Publications ==
Books, a selection:

- Kloek, T., Henri Theil and John C.G. Boot. Operations Research and Quantitative Economics: an elementary introduction. With McGraw-Hill, 1965.
- Heij, C., De Boer, P., Franses, P. H., Kloek, T., & Van Dijk, H. K. Econometric methods with applications in business and economics. Oxford University Press, 2004.

Articles, a selection:

- Kloek, T.; Theil, H. (1960), "The operational implications of imperfect models", in Arrow, Kenneth J.; Karlin, Samuel; Suppes, Patrick (eds.), Mathematical models in the social sciences, 1959: Proceedings of the first Stanford symposium, Stanford mathematical studies in the social sciences, IV, Stanford, California: Stanford University Press, pp. 105–128, ISBN 9780804700214.
- Kloek, T.; Mennes, L.B.M. (1960), "Simultaneous equations estimation based on principal components of predetermined variables." Econometrica: Journal of the Econometric Society 28: 45–61.
- Kloek, T.; Theil, H. (1965), "International comparison of prices and quantities consumed." Econometrica: Journal of the Econometric Society 33: 535–556.
- Kloek, T.; Barten, A.P.; Lempers, F.B.M. (1969), "A note on a class of utility and production functions yielding everywhere differentiable demand functions." The Review of Economic Studies. 36: 109–111.
- Kloek, T.; Van Dijk, Herman K. (1978), "Bayesian estimates of equation system parameters: an application of integration by Monte Carlo," Econometrica 46.1: 1–19.
- Kloek, T.; Van Dijk, Herman K. (1980), "Further experience in Bayesian analysis using Monte Carlo integration." Journal of Econometrics 14.3: 307–328.
- Kloek, Teun. "OLS estimation in a model where a microvariable is explained by aggregates and contemporaneous disturbances are equicorrelated." Econometrica: Journal of the Econometric Society (1981): 205–207.
- Kloek, T.; Van Praag, Bernard; de Leeuw, Jan (1986), "The population‐sample decomposition approach to multivariate estimation methods." Applied Stochastic Models and Data Analysis 2.3: 99–119.
- Kloek, T.; van Dijk, Herman K. (1978), "Efficient estimation of income distribution parameters." Journal of Econometrics 8.1: 61–74.
