= Econometric Institute =

Dutch research institute

Econometric Institute (Dutch Econometrisch Instituut) at the Erasmus University Rotterdam is a leading research institute in the fields of econometrics and management science in the Netherlands. The Institute offers advanced education in econometrics. It was founded in 1956 by Henri Theil in cooperation with Jan Tinbergen.

== History ==
=== Foundation ===
The first proposal for a special institute in quantitative economics at the Netherlands School of Economics in Rotterdam was made by Henri Theil in 1953 with support of Jan Tinbergen, while working at the Central Planning Bureau. The senate of the school added the requirement that it "would not confine itself to economic applications, but would also give attention to business problems, which implied that operations research had to be included in the program."

In the year 1955–56 Theil was Visiting Professor at the University of Chicago, where he made a similar proposal again with support of Jan Tinbergen. This proposal was eventually accepted both in Chicago and in Rotterdam, and the Econometric Institute started September 1956 in Chicago and later in Rotterdam.

The Econometric Institute was the first research institute in the field of econometrics in the world, and started with a research staff of 6. Henri Theil became its first director, and headed the institute until 1966.

=== Development ===
In the early years the Institute developed a full academic program in Econometrics. The program originally focussed on "national and international macroeconomic policy; the required computing power to estimate econometric models was expensive and scarcely available, so that econometrics was almost exclusively applied in public (statistical) agencies." This evolved over the years. In this time many leading econometricians were guest at the Institute.

=== Today ===
Today, the Econometric Institute offers several Bachelor and Master programmes in Econometrics, and a substantial number of well-known econometricians have their roots in Rotterdam. The institute is part of an active research community within the Erasmus School of Economics and participates in the research networks and graduate programmes of the Tinbergen Institute, the Erasmus Research Institute of Management (ERIM), and LNMB (the National Network for Operations Research).

The research of the Econometric Institute covers roughly three areas: Econometrics, Operations Research, and Data Science & Statistics. This research is applied to the domains of Energy & Sustainability, Transportation & Logistics, Climate, Policy Evaluation, Finance, and Analytics for Business, thereby contributing greatly to both fundamental research and societal impact.

== Directors ==
Directors since 1956

- 1956 - 1956 : Jan Tinbergen
- 1956 - 1966 : Henri Theil
- 1966 - 1971 : Jan Sandee
- 1971 - 1982 : Willem Somermeyer
- 1982 - 1987 : Alexander Rinnooy Kan (co-director)
- 1982 - 1992 : Teun Kloek (co-director)
- 1987 - 1992 : Harm Bart (co-director)
- 1992 - 1998 : Ton Vorst
- 1998 - 2003 : Herman K. van Dijk
- 2004 - 2006 : Philip Hans Franses
- 2006 – 2014 : Albert Wagelmans
- 2014 – 2020: Patrick Groenen
- 2020 - present: Dennis Fok

== See also ==
- Erasmus Research Institute of Management
- Tinbergen Institute
- TRAIL Research School

== Literature ==
- Erwin Dekker, Jan Tinbergen (1903–1994) and the Rise of Economic Expertise, Cambridge University Press, 2021.
- Matthijs Dicke, Ambitie en identiteit : van Nederlandsche Handels-Hoogeschool tot Erasmus Universiteit Rotterdam 1913-2013, Stad en Bedrijf, Rotterdam, 2013.
- Bas Diemel, Erasmus School of Economics honderd jaar, Stad en Bedrijf, Rotterdam, 2013.
