= Jan Tinbergen =

Dutch economist and Nobel Laureate (1903–1994)

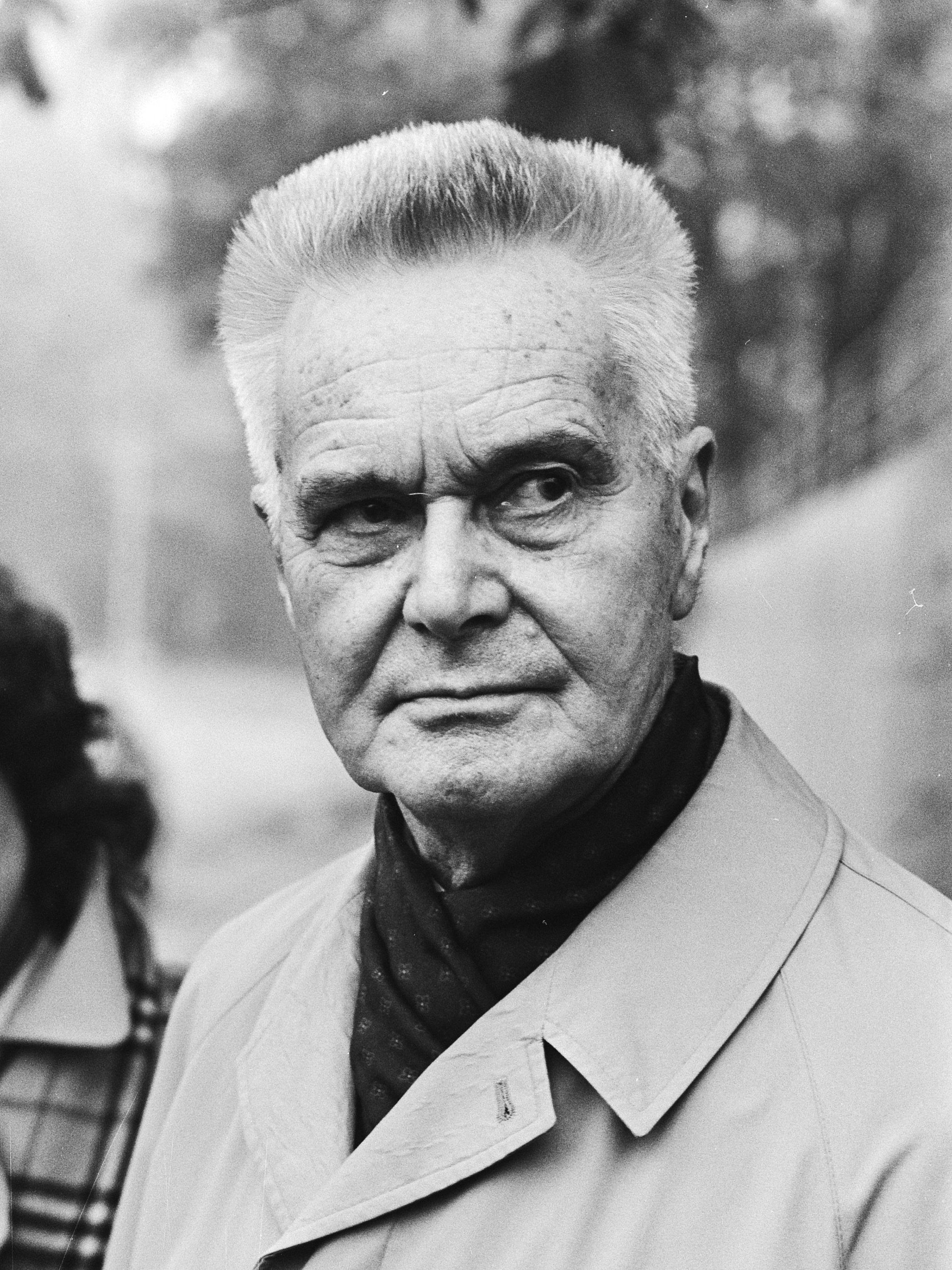
- Tinbergen in 1982
- Born: 12 April 1903; The Hague, Netherlands
- Died: 9 June 1994 (aged 91); The Hague, Netherlands
- Education: Leiden University (PhD) 1929
- Known for: First national macroeconomic model
- Awards: Erasmus Prize (1967); Nobel Memorial Prize in Economic Sciences (1969)
- Scientific career
- Fields: Economics, econometrics
- Workplaces: Erasmus University
- Doctoral advisor: Paul Ehrenfest
- Doctoral students: Tjalling Koopmans; Hans van den Doel; Supachai Panitchpakdi; Ashok Mitra

Jan Tinbergen (/ˈtɪnbɜːrɡən/ TIN-bur-gən, Dutch: [jɑn ˈtɪmbɛrɣə(n)]; 12 April 1903 – 9 June 1994) was a Dutch economist who was awarded the first Nobel Memorial Prize in Economic Sciences in 1969, which he shared with Ragnar Frisch for having developed and applied dynamic models for the analysis of economic processes. He is widely considered to be one of the most influential economists of the 20th century and one of the founding fathers of econometrics.

His important contributions to econometrics include the development of the first macroeconometric models, the solution of the identification problem, and the understanding of dynamic models. Tinbergen was a founding trustee of Economists for Peace and Security. In 1945, he founded the Bureau for Economic Policy Analysis (CPB) and was the agency's first director.

== Biography ==
Tinbergen was the eldest of five children of Dirk Cornelis Tinbergen and Jeannette van Eek. His brother Nikolaas "Niko" Tinbergen would also win a Nobel Prize (for physiology, during 1973) for his work in ethology, while his youngest brother Luuk would become a famous ornithologist. Jan and Nikolaas Tinbergen are the only siblings to have both won Nobel Prizes.

Between 1921 and 1925, Tinbergen studied mathematics and physics at the University of Leiden under Paul Ehrenfest. During those years at Leiden, he had numerous discussions with Ehrenfest, Kamerlingh Onnes, Hendrik Lorentz, Pieter Zeeman and Albert Einstein.

After graduating, Tinbergen fulfilled his community service in the administration of a prison in Rotterdam and at the Central Bureau of Statistics (CBS) in The Hague. He then returned to the University of Leiden and in 1929 defended his PhD thesis titled "Minimumproblemen in de natuurkunde en de economie" (Minimisation problems in Physics and Economics). This topic was suggested by Ehrenfest and allowed Tinbergen to combine his interests in mathematics, physics, economics and politics. At that time, CBS established a new department of business surveys and mathematical statistics, and Tinbergen became its first chairman, working at CBS until 1945. Access to the vast CBS data helped Tinbergen in testing his theoretical models. In parallel, starting from 1931, he was professor of statistics at the University of Amsterdam, and in 1933 he was appointed associate professor of mathematics and statistics at The Netherlands School of Economics, Rotterdam, where he stayed until 1973.

From 1929 to 1945 he worked for the Dutch statistical office and served as consultant at the Economic and Financial Organization of the League of Nations (1936–1938). In 1945 he became the first director of the Netherlands Bureau for Economic Policy Analysis and left this position in 1955 to focus on education. He spent one year as a visiting professor at the Harvard University and then returned to the Dutch Economic Institute (the successor of the Netherlands School of Economics). In parallel, he provided consulting services to international organizations and governments of various developing countries, such as United Arab Republic, Turkey, Venezuela, Surinam, Indonesia and Pakistan.

Tinbergen became a member of the Royal Netherlands Academy of Arts and Sciences in 1946. He was also a member of the International Academy of Science, Munich. In 1956 he founded the Econometric Institute at the Erasmus Universiteit Rotterdam together with Henri Theil, who also was his successor in Rotterdam. In 1960, he was elected as a Fellow of the American Statistical Association and the American Academy of Arts and Sciences. The Tinbergen Institute was named in his honour. The International Institute of Social Studies (ISS) awarded its Honorary Fellowship to Jan Tinbergen in 1962. He was elected to the American Philosophical Society in 1963. In 1968, he received an honorary doctorate from Sir George Williams University, which later became Concordia University. He was elected to the United States National Academy of Sciences in 1974.

== Work ==
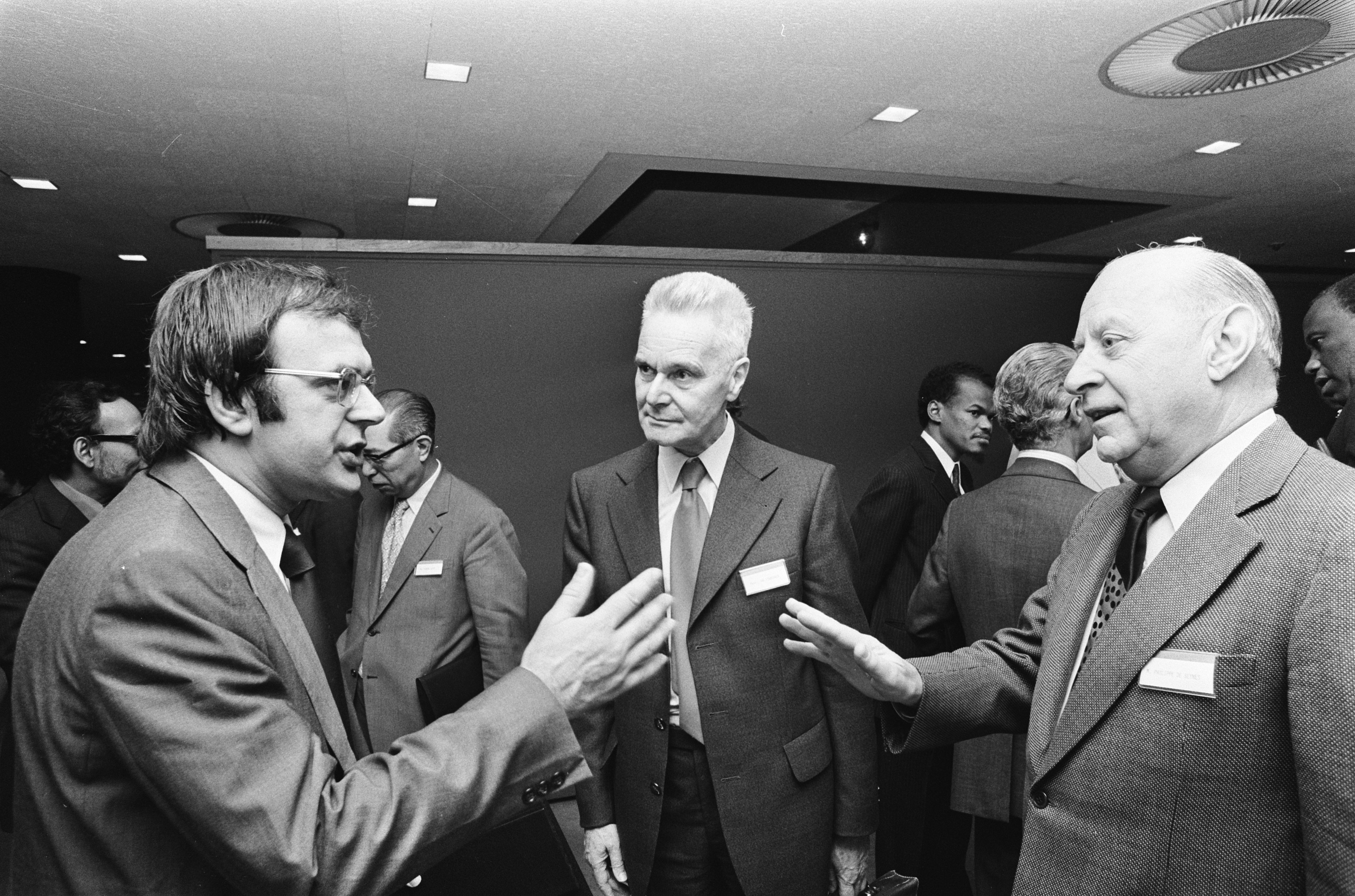
Minister Pronk, Tinbergen and De Seynes at an economy symposium in The Hague, 23 May 1975

For many, Jan Tinbergen became known for the so-called 'Tinbergen Norm' often discussed long after his death. There is no written work of Tinbergen in which he himself states it formally. It is generally believed to be the principle that, if the ratio between the greatest and least income exceeds 5, it becomes disadvantageous for the societal unit involved. Tinbergen himself discussed some technicalities of a five-to-one income distribution ratio in an article published in 1981. Apart from specifics about a five-to-one ratio, it is true in general that Tinbergen's grand theme was income distribution and the search for an optimal social order.

Tinbergen developed the first national comprehensive macroeconomic model, which he first developed in 1936 for the Netherlands, and later applied to the United States and the United Kingdom.

In his work on macroeconomic modelling and economic policy making, Tinbergen classified some economic quantities as targets and others as instruments. Targets are those macroeconomic variables the policy maker wishes to influence, whereas instruments are the variables that the policy maker can control directly. Tinbergen emphasized that achieving the desired values of a certain number of targets requires the policy maker to control an equal number of instruments. This is known as the Tinbergen Rule.

Tinbergen was appointed to the Dutch Government commission set up to oversee the design and construction of the Delta Works in the aftermath of the North Sea Flood of 1953, the Deltacommissie (English: Delta Commission). As part of the commission's work, he produced a cost–benefit analysis for the Delta Works in 1954, and again in 1960. His work for the commission has been noted as one of the first formal social cost/benefit appraisals of a national infrastructure project.

Tinbergen's classification remains influential today, underlying the theory of monetary policy used by central banks. Many central banks today regard the inflation rate as their target; the policy instrument they use to control inflation is the short-term interest rate.

Tinbergen's work on macroeconomic models was later continued by Lawrence Klein, contributing to another Nobel Memorial Prize in Economic Sciences. For his cultural contributions, he was given the Gouden Ganzenveer in 1985.

Tinbergen's econometric modelling lead to a lively debate with several known participants including J.M. Keynes, Ragnar Frisch and Milton Friedman. The debate is sometime referred to as the Tinbergen debate.

== Selected publications ==
- World security and equity. Aldershot, 1990. ISBN 1852781874.
- Production, income and welfare: the search for an optimal social order. Brighton, 1985 ISBN 0745000142.
- Economic policy: Principles and Design. Amsterdam, 1978. ISBN 0720431298.
- Der Dialog Nord-Süd: Informationen zur Entwicklungspolitik. Frankfurt am Main: Europ. Verlagsanstalt, 1977.
- Income distribution: analysis and policies. New York, 1975. ISBN 0444108327.
- The Dynamics of Business Cycles: A Study in Economic Fluctuations. Chicago: U of Chicago P, 1974. ISBN 0226804186.
- The Element of Space in Development Planning (together with L.B.M. Mennes and J.G. Waardenburg), Amsterdam, 1969
- Development planning. London, 1967.
- Central planning. Studies in comparative economics, 4. New Haven, 1964.
- Shaping the world economy, suggestions for an international economic policy. New York, 1962.
- Report of the Delta Commission. Volume 6. Contribution 5: The economic balance of the Delta Plan (in Socio-economic aspects of the Delta Plan). The Hague, 1961.
- Selected papers. Amsterdam, 1959
- Economic Policy: Principles and Design, Amsterdam, 1956
- Centralization and Decentralization in Economic Policy, Amsterdam, 1954 ISBN 0313230773.
- Econometrics. London, 1953.
- On the Theory of Economic Policy. Second edition (1952) is Volume 1 of Contributions to Economic Analysis, Amsterdam: North-Holland.
- Business Cycles in the United Kingdom, 1870–1914, Amsterdam, 1951
- International economic co-operation. Amsterdam, 1945.
- Business Cycles in the United States, 1919–1932, Geneva, 1939 and New York, 1968.
- An econometric approach to business cycle problems. In: Impasses économiques; 2; Actualités scientifiques et industrielles, ISSN 0365-6861; 525. Paris, 1937.

About Tinbergen

- Acocella, Nicola, Di Bartolomeo, Giovanni (2006), Tinbergen and Theil meet Nash: controllability in policy games, in: Economics Letters, 90(2): 213–218.
- Acocella, Nicola, Di Bartolomeo, Giovanni and Hughes Hallett, A. [2010], Policy games, policy neutrality and Tinbergen controllability under rational expectations, in: Journal of Macroeconomics, 32(1): 55–67.
- Acocella, Nicola Di Bartolomeo, Giovanni and Hughes Hallett, A. [2011], Tinbergen controllability and n-player LQ-games, in: Economics Letters, 113: 32–4.
- Murshed, SM. 2021. "Reformulating Jan Tinbergen's normative vision on welfare and security." Journal of Peace Research.

== See also ==
- List of economists

Awards
New creation	Laureate of the Nobel Memorial Prize in Economics; 1969; Served alongside: Ragnar Frisch	Succeeded by Paul A. Samuelson
