= Henk Tijms =

Dutch mathematician

Henk Tijms (Beverwijk, April 23, 1944) is a Dutch mathematician and Emeritus Professor of Operations Research at the VU University Amsterdam.

He studied mathematics in Amsterdam where he graduated from the University of Amsterdam in 1972 under supervision of Gijsbert de Leve.

Tijms is the author of several articles on applied mathematics and stochastics and books on probability. His best-known books are Stochastic Modeling and Analysis (Wiley, 1986), Understanding Probability (Cambridge University Press, 2004) and Basic Probability, What Every Math Student Should Know (World Scientific Press, 2021).

On October 12, 2008, Tijms became the first non-American to receive the INFORMS Expository Writing Award. The award honoured his achievements in the field of mathematics.
