= Hans van den Doel (Labour Party) =

Dutch politician (1937–2012)

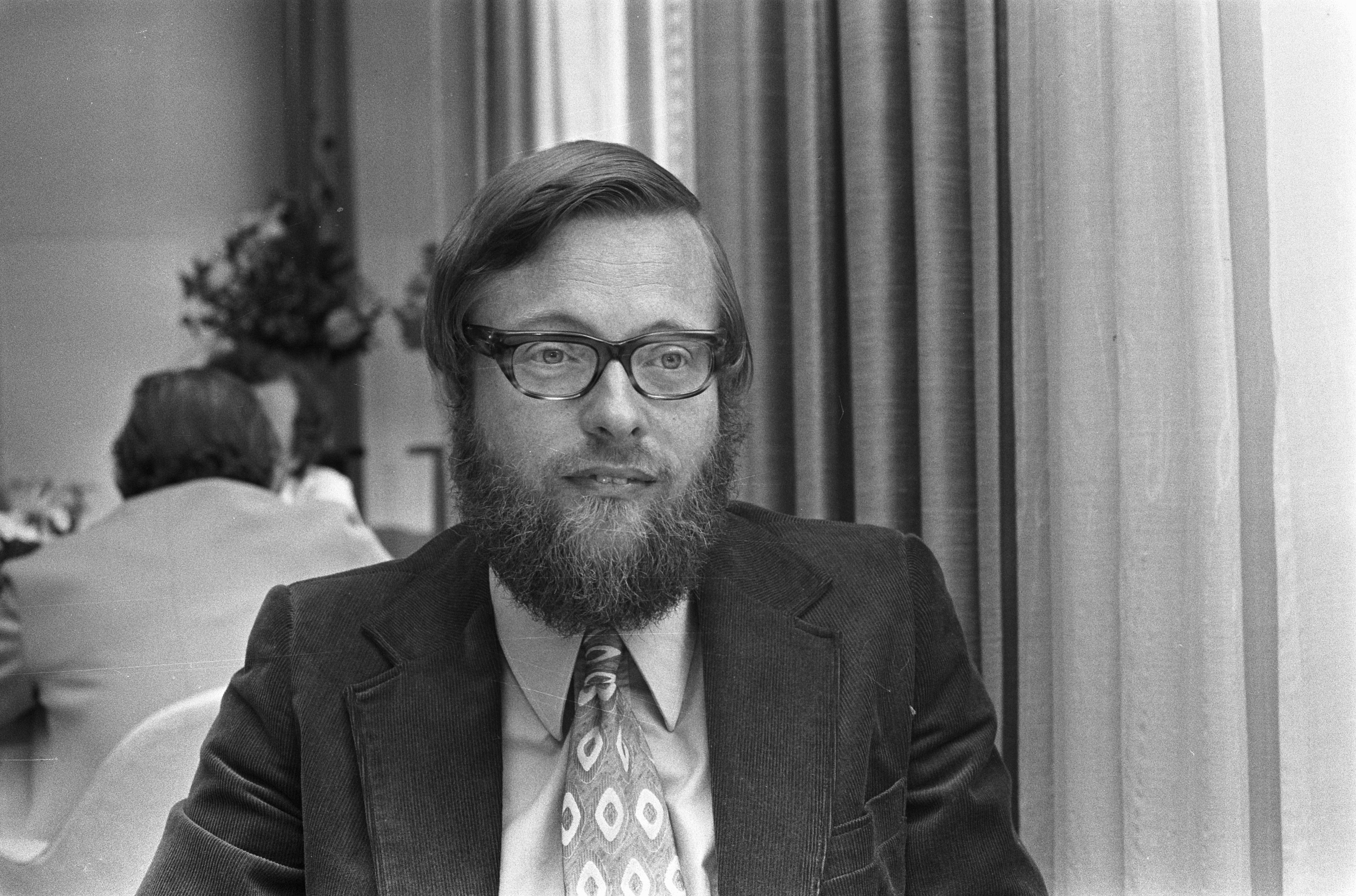

Member of the House of Representatives
- In office 23 February 1967 – 28 August 1973

Personal details
- Born: Johannes van den Doel; 4 April 1937 Zierikzee, Netherlands
- Died: 28 March 2012 (aged 74) Koudum, Netherlands
- Party: Labour Party
- Education: Vrije Universiteit (MSc); Erasmus University Rotterdam (PhD)
- Occupation: Politician; Economist; Political scientist professor Teacher; Author

Johannes "Hans" van den Doel (4 April 1937 – 28 March 2012) was a Dutch politician of the Labour Party (PvdA). He served as a Member of the House of Representatives from 23 February 1967 until 28 August 1973. An economist and political scientist by occupation. He worked as a professor of political science at the Radboud University Nijmegen from 1973 until 1975 when he became a professor of economics at the University of Amsterdam. In 1981 he suffered a cerebral infarction (cerebral hemorrhage) at the age of 44, he survived but became paralyzed and there was an end to his scientific career. The last 30 years of his life he was largely disabled.

== Politics ==
Van den Doel belonged to the founding members of Nieuw Links, then a nascent new left movement in the Labour Party. He was critical of Joop den Uyl's advocacy of a mixed economy.
