= Tinbergen Institute =

Economics research institute in the Netherlands

The Tinbergen Institute is a joint institute for research and education in economics, econometrics and finance of the VU University Amsterdam, the University of Amsterdam, and the Erasmus University Rotterdam. The institute was founded in 1987 and is named after the Dutch economist Jan Tinbergen, a Nobel Prize-winning professor at the Erasmus University Rotterdam.

The Tinbergen Institute has over 200 research fellows from the three participating Universities, and some 190 PhD students. It is ranked 1st among the World's Top Financial Economics and Finance Departments according to IDEAS/RePEc. It is ranked 127th among the World's Top Economic Institutions according to IDEAS/RePEc. The three universities that jointly operate the Tinbergen Institute all ranked among the top 100 economic schools in the world according to The Tilburg University Economics School Research Ranking based on research contributions from 2016-2020, with the VU ranked 39th, followed closely by the EUR which is ranked 42nd and the UvA which is ranked 48th. By 2020 and 2021 Shanghai Global Academic Subject Ranking for Economics, EUR is ranked 34-35th, the VU 45th, and the UvA 51-75th in the world.

It cooperates with economics and econometrics departments, including Harvard University and Princeton University in the US, and Pompeu Fabra University, Oxford University, University College London, and European University Institute in Europe.

Awarded Honorary Fellow of the Tinbergen Institute are Mars Cramer, Teun Kloek, Jean Paelinck, Herman K. van Dijk, Bernard van Praag and Henk Tijms.

Tinbergen Institute has placed its PhD graduates at leading academic and policy institutions. Recent PhD graduates have secured their first jobs as Assistant Professors at Copenhagen Business School, INSEAD, HEC Paris, Norwegian School of Economics, Fudan University, Monash University, Pompeu Fabra University, Rutgers University, University of Tilburg, University of Vienna, Warwick Business School, for example; and as postdocs at e.g., Yale University, Columbia University, University of Oxford, University of Cambridge, Chicago Booth Business School. Sometimes graduates also go to policy institutes or central banks, e.g., Federal Reserve Board, Banks for International Settlement, and Bank of England.

== Founding Board of Directors ==
Bernard van Praag (Chairman); Frans van Winden; Peter Nijkamp; Jean-Marie Viaene; Jaap Spronk; Henk Jager

== Directors ==
- 1986–1992 : Bernard van Praag
- 1992–1998 : Herman K. van Dijk
- 1998–2004 : Coen Teulings
- 2004–2008 : Maarten Janssen
- 2008-2010 : Herman K. van Dijk
- 2010-2016: Bauke Visser
- 2016-present: Eric Bartelsman

== Notable alumni ==
- Dirk Bezemer (born 1971), economist
