= Anton Julius Butter =

Dutch economist (1920–1989)

Anton Julius (Ton) Butter (10 January 1920 – 1989) was a Dutch economist, Associate Professor the Department of Economics of the University of Amsterdam and deputy director of SEO Economic Research.

== Biography ==
Butter was born in Amsterdam and received his MA in economics at the University of Amsterdam, where he started working as research assistant, and later assistant professor and associate professor at the Department of Economics. He was also researcher at the Foundation for Economic research, later SEO Economic Research, where from 1975 till 1977 he was deputy director as successor of Joop Klant.

Late 1960s Butter published his first articles in De Economist. In the 1970s and 1980s he further published multiple reports about his economic research projects for SEO Economic Research.

In 1979 Butter received his PhD at the University of Amsterdam under supervision of Jan Lambooy with a thesis entitled "Wat heet onafhankelijk? : aspecten van de buitenlandse handel van de Nederlandse Antillen in relatie tot de vraagstukken van economische, sociale en staatkundige ontwikkeling" (What is called independent? : Aspects of foreign trade of the Netherlands Antilles in relation to the issues of economic, social and political development). He is credited as "keen and level-headed observer of the Dutch Caribbean scene, his mind uncluttered by sociological preconception, yet open to social peculiarity inherent in the region".

== Publications ==
Publications, a selection:

- 1977: Primitive Economists: is that what We Are?.. University of Amsterdam. Dept. of economics.
- 1979: Samenleving en onderzoek. Joop Klant, Wim Driehuis, Herman J. Bierens en Anton Julius Butter (red.)
- 1982: A road to full employment : an essay on regulation, deregulation, enterprise zones and the producibility of jobs. Amsterdam : Grüner
- 1984: An introduction to mini-economics. Amsterdam : Grüner
