= Folkert de Roos =

Dutch economist (1920–2000)

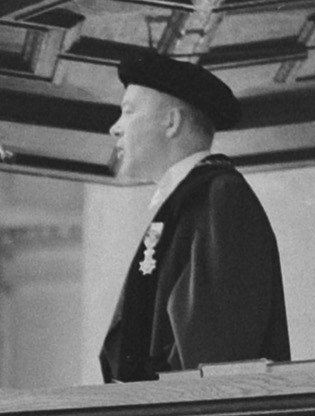
de Roos in 1963

Folkert de Roos (3 September 1920 – 12 July 2000) was a Dutch economist and Professor of Economics at the Vrije Universiteit in Amsterdam.

== Biography ==
Born on 3 September 1920, in a Reformed family in Leeuwarden where his father was working as baker, De Roos started to study Economics at the Netherlands School of Economics in Rotterdam late-1930s. There he received his MA in 1942, and later in 1949 his PhD cum laude with a thesis entitled "De algemene banken in Nederland" (The general banks of the Netherlands). This work would become a seminal work for generations of Dutch students.

In 1943, De Roos had started working for the Mees & Zn back in Rotterdam, where he soon became head of the Economic Bureau. After graduation in 1949 he was appointed Professor of Economics at new Department of Economics at the Vrije Universiteit in Amsterdam. His doctoral student were Dirk Cornelis Renooij (1951), Willem Hessel (1962), Jac Koolschijn (1970), Pieter Van Veen (1970) Wouter Roes (1973), Gerrit Faber (1981), Paul Hilbers (1986) et al.

He became more generally known as member Social-Economic Council since early 1950s, and as author of articles in the Economisch-Statistische Berichten He was also editor for De Economist, member of the Royal Netherlands Academy of Arts and Sciences since 1980, and board member at the De Nederlandsche Bank. He died on 12 July 2000, aged 79.

== Publications ==
De Roos has authored and co-authored numerous publications. Books, a selection:

- 1949. De algemene banken in Nederland. Doctoral thesis Netherlands School of Economics, Rotterdam
- 1953. Een halve eeuw rente in Nederland. With Wiert Jan Wieringa. Levensverzekering-maatschappij HAV Bank, 1953.
- 1957. Inleiding tot de theorie der internationale economische betrekkingen. Haarlem : De Erven F. Bohn
- 1960. Groeitheorie. With D.B.J. Schouten. Haarlem : Bohn
- 1991. Over geld, rente en wisselkoersen : een selectie uit de verspreide publikaties van prof. dr. F. de Roos P.A. Geljon et al. eds. Leiden : Stenfert Kroese
