= Van den Goorbergh =

Van den Goorbergh is a Dutch surname. Notable people with this surname are:

- Edith van den Goorbergh (born 1933), Dutch theologian
- Jurgen van den Goorbergh (born 1969), Dutch motorcycle road racer
- Wim van den Goorbergh (born 1948), Dutch economist and banker
- Zonta van den Goorbergh (born 2005), Dutch motorcycle road racer
