= Jan Lambooy =

Dutch geographer

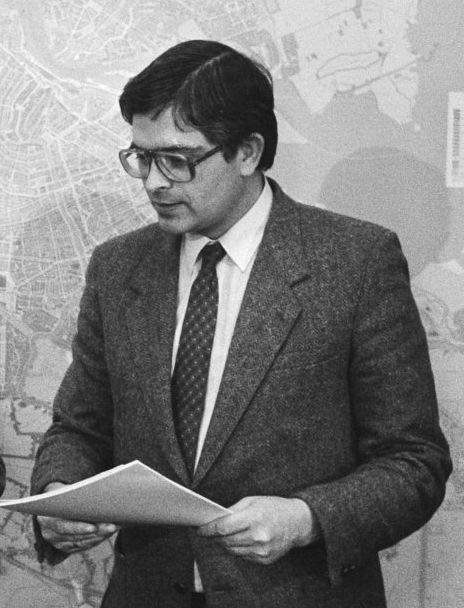
J.G. Lambooy, 1983

Johannes Gerard (Jan) Lambooy (born 23 October 1937) is a Dutch social geographer and emeritus professor Economic geography and Urban economics at the University of Amsterdam.

== Biography ==
Born in Pajeti, Central Sumba Regency, Indonesia, Lambooy studied at the Vrije Universiteit in Amsterdam. He received his MA in social geography in 1962, and his PhD in 1969 for the thesis "De agrarische hervorming in Tunesië: proeve van een sociaal-geografisch onderzoek."

In 1972 Lambooy was appointed Professor of Economic Geography and Urban Economics at the Faculty of Economics of the University of Amsterdam. He supervised about 55 doctoral student, among them Anton Julius Butter, Ron Boschma and Barbara Baarsma.

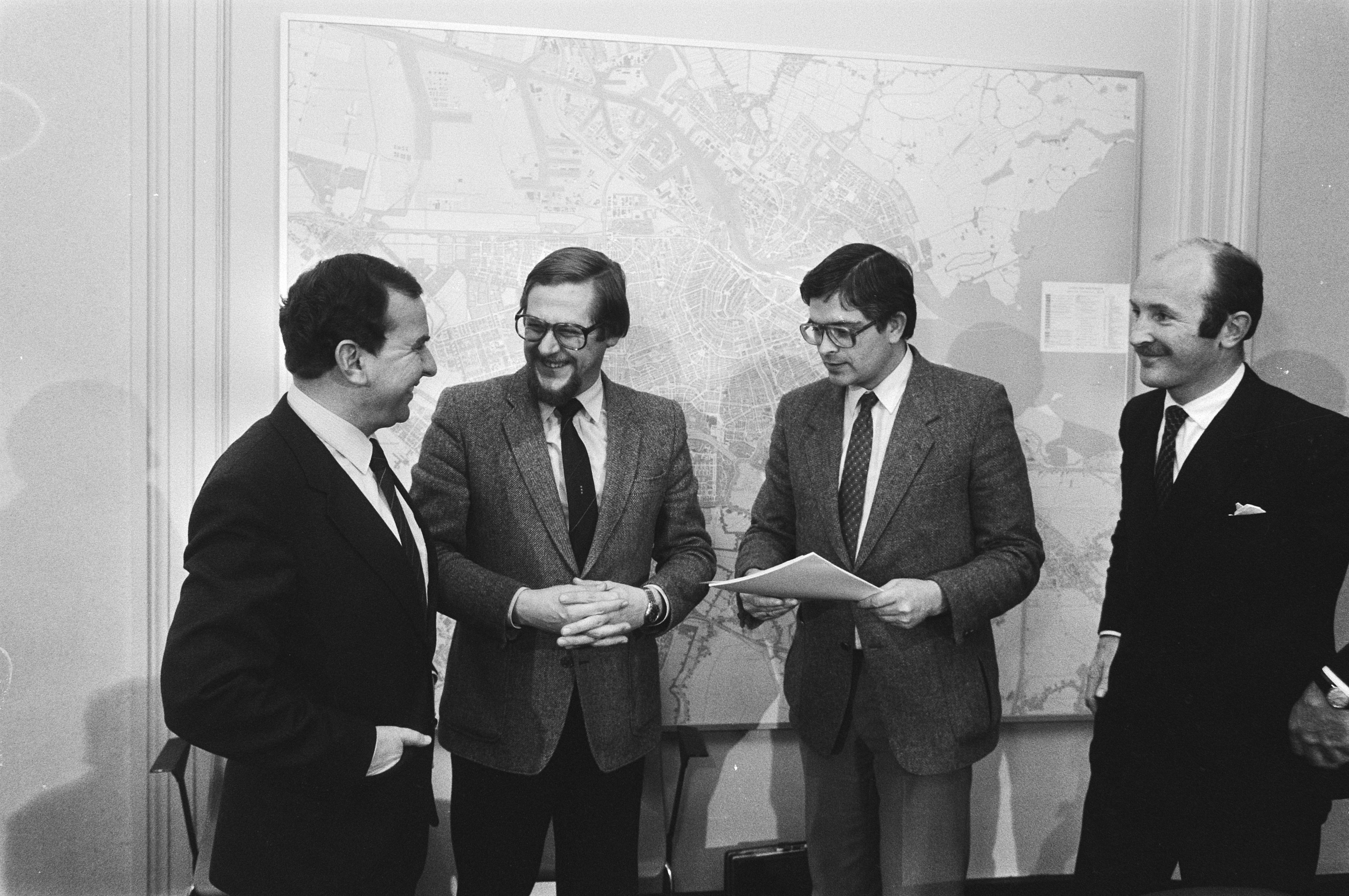
1983 meeting.

From 1977 to 1979 he was co-director of SEO Economic Research, where he was succeeded by Wim Driehuis. He was also the first director of the university's Institute for Environmental Studies. He retired at the University of Amsterdam in 2002. From 1998 to 2002 Lambooy has been Professor of Economic geography at the Utrecht University.

In 2005 Lambooy was awarded the Carfax prize for the best article in European Planning Studies.

== Publications ==
Lambooy has published numerous articles. A selection:

- Boschma, Ron A., and Jan G. Lambooy. "Evolutionary economics and economic geography." Journal of evolutionary economics 9.4 (1999): 411–429.
- Hueting, Roefie, Lucas Reijnders, Bart de Boer, Jan Lambooy, Huib Jansen (1998). "The concept of environmental function and its valuation". Ecological Economics, 25(1), 31–35.
- Lambooy, Jan G., and Ron A. Boschma. "Evolutionary economics and regional policy." The Annals of Regional Science 35.1 (2001): 113–131.
- Boschma, Ron A., and Jan G. Lambooy. "Knowledge, market structure, and economic coordination: dynamics of industrial districts." Growth and Change 33.3 (2002): 291–311.
