= Baarsma =

Baarsma is a surname. Notable people with the surname include:

- Bill Baarsma, American politician and academic
- Barbara Baarsma (born 1969), Dutch economist
