= Keuzenkamp =

Keuzenkamp is a surname. Notable people with the surname include:

- Carike Keuzenkamp (born 1947), South African singer
- Hugo Keuzenkamp (born 1961), Dutch economist
