= Joop Klant =

Dutch economist, novelist and professor

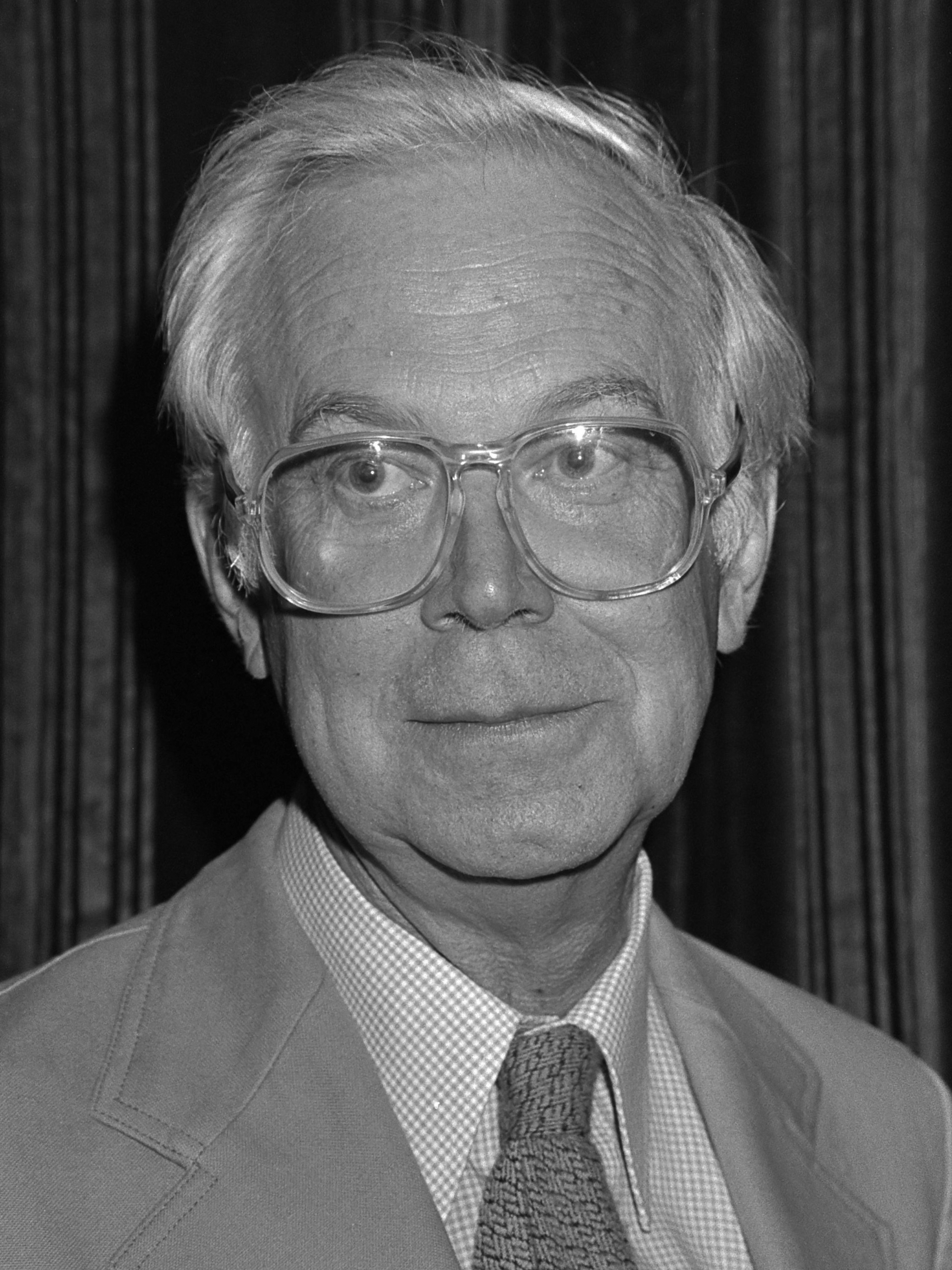
Joop Klant, 1979

Jacobus Johannes (Joop) Klant (1 March 1915 in Warmenhuizen – 26 December 1994 in Amsterdam) was a Dutch economist, novelist and professor of political economy at the University of Amsterdam.

== Biography ==
His parents were Pieter Klant en Geertje de Moor. He studied economics at the University of Amsterdam. In the late 1930s he broke off his studies to succeed his deceased father, who had been paymaster of the vegetable auction in Warmenhuizen. Later in 1954 he completed his studies in economics. Again twenty years later in 1973, he published his PhD thesis entitled "Spelregels voor Economen" ("Rules for Economists"). This methodological treatise attracted much attention and was honored in 1978 with Kluwer Price.

After studying economics in Amsterdam, Klant worked as statistician at the National Office for Construction Material in Amsterdam. Just after the Second World War Klant left for South Africa, where he worked as statistician for eight years in Pretoria. Back in the Netherlands, he worked at the research centre of the Nederlandse Handelsmaatschappij, later ABN.

In 1966 he became a lecturer and since 1975, he has been a professor of political economy at the University of Amsterdam. Klant was one of the founding members of the department for "History and Methodology of Economic Science", now the "History & Methodology of Economics" (HME) group. From 1966 until 1975 Klant was director of SEO Economic Research as successor of Jacobus Franciscus Haccoû.

In 1947 Klant was awarded the Lucy B. en C.W. van der Hoogtprijs by the Maatschappij der Nederlandse Letterkunde for his novel De geboorte van Jan Klaassen from 1946. Further in his life Klant always kept in though with the humanities: as chairman of the Fonds van de Letteren, and as of De Bezige Bij publishing company.

In 1993 he received the Akademiepenning of the Royal Netherlands Academy of Arts and Sciences, together with Arie Pais. In the same year, he and Theodore Aloysius Stevers were also awarded the Pierson Penning.

His sister Sabeth Klant was prominent advocate in the second wave of feminism. She was among other thing treasurer for the Wij vrouwen eisen. In Pretoria on 24 January 1948 Joop Klant married Anna Joana (Jacqueline) Faljan Vlielander Hein (born 1911). She was member of the Hein family, daughter of Benjamin Marius Faijan Vlielander Hein (1887–1959) and Anna Josenhans (1889–1961).

== Publications ==
- 1946: De geboorte van Jan Klaassen
- 1954: De fiets (3rd ed. 1979)
- 1956: Hollands Diep
- 1973: Wandeling door Walein
- 1973: Spelregels voor economen; de logische structuur van economische theorieën (2e druk 1979)
- 1975: Wat is economie? Inaugural speech,
- 1977: Geld en banken
- 1979: Samenleving en onderzoek. Joop Klant, Wim Driehuis, Herman J. Bierens en Anton Julius Butter (red.)
- 1980: Balansreeksen 1900-1975 van financiële instellingen in Nederland
- 1987: Filosofie van de Economische Wetenschappen
- 1988: Geld, Banken en Financiële Markten (met Casper van Ewijk) ook: 1990, 1992
- 1988: Het ontstaan van de staathuishoudkunde

Articles, a selection

- 1990: "Refutability" In: Methodus December 1990. p. 6-9

About Klant

- Een lezenswaardig interview uit 1978 met J. J. Klant in: Arnold Heertje & Ria Kuip - Dat bonte economenvolk (1979)
