= Dick Schouten =

Dutch economist (1923–2018)

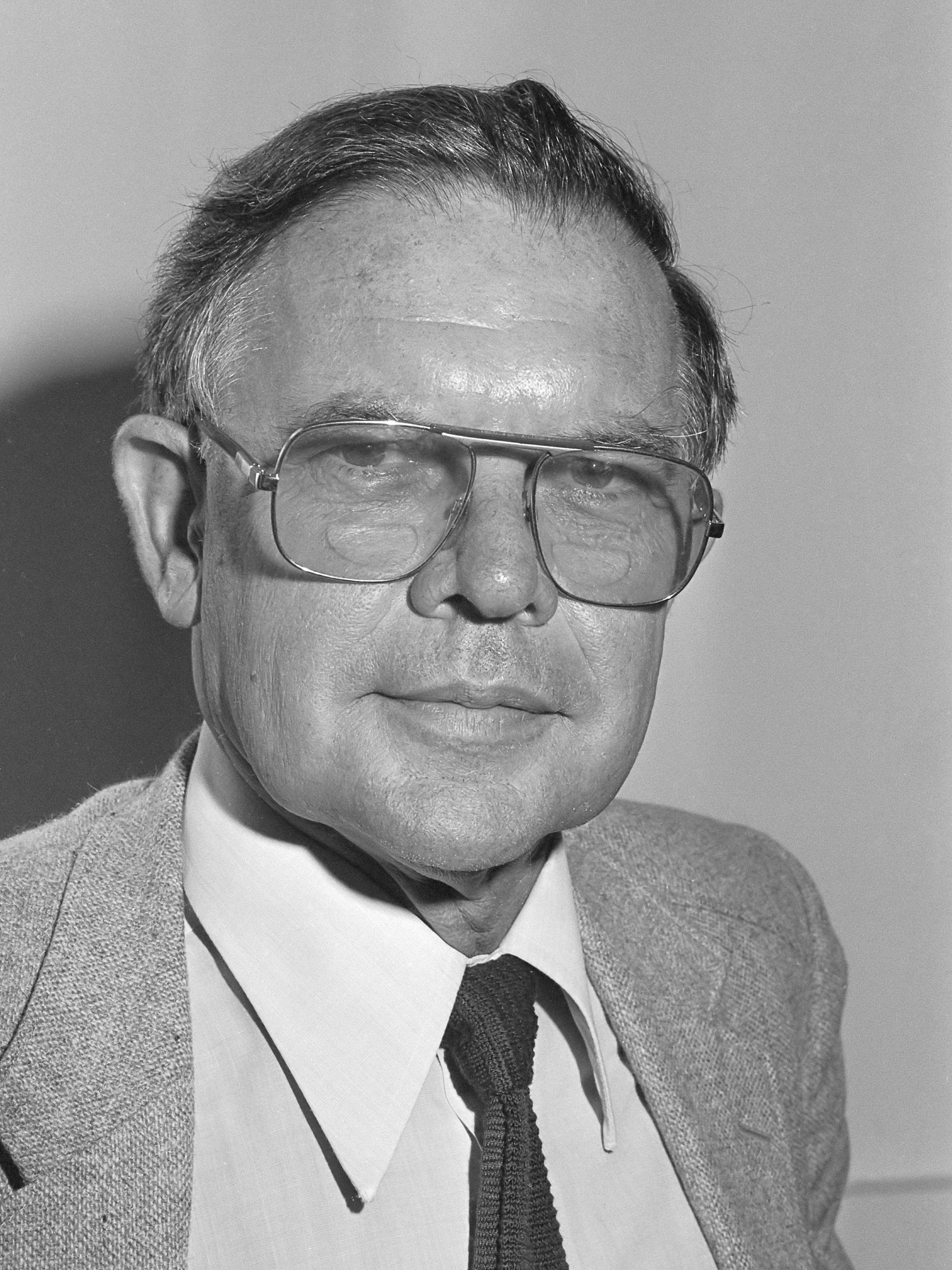
- Dick Schouten (1982)
- Born: 25 January 1923; Frankfurt am Main
- Died: 3 February 2018 (aged 95); Oisterwijk

Academic work
- Institutions: Tilburg University

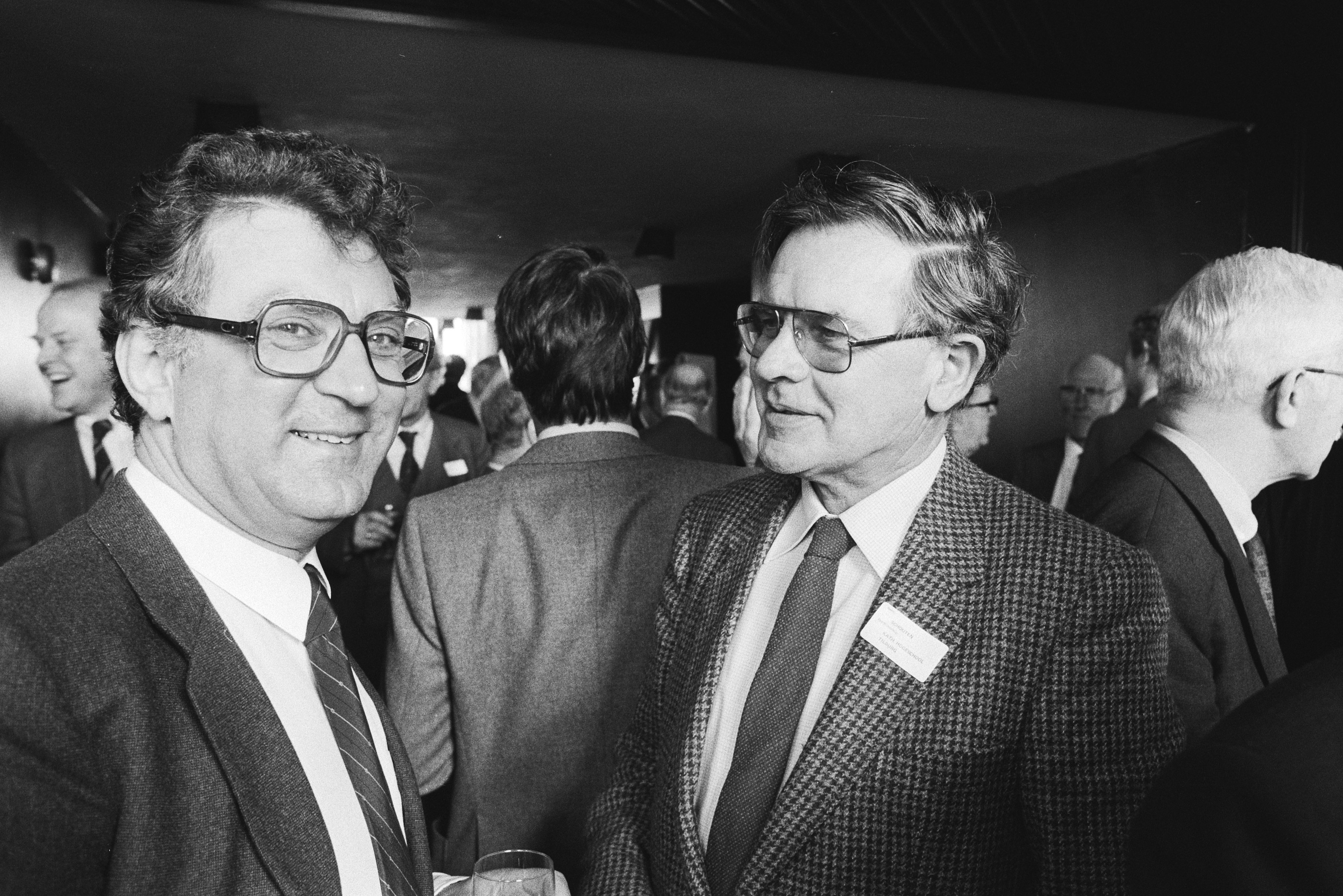
Arnold Heertje (left) with Schouten in 1983

Dirk Bernard Joseph Schouten (25 January 1923 – 3 February 2018), known as Dick Schouten, was a Dutch economist, and Professor of General Economics and Economic History at Tilburg University, known for his work concerning macroeconomic modelling.

== Biography ==
Schouten received his PhD from Tilburg University in 1950 with a thesis entitled "De overheidsfinanciën in de volkshuishouding : een macro-economische studie over de betekenis van de openbare financiën op lange termijn voor de omvang, de verdeling en de besteding van het nationaal inkomen", supervised by M.J.H. Smeets.

After his graduation, Schouten kept working for the Bureau for Economic Policy Analysis. In 1954, he got appointed Professor of Economics and History of Economics at Tilburg University. Among his doctoral students were Theo van de Klundert (PhD 1962), Piet A. Verheyen (PhD 1962), Ad Kolnaar (PhD 1969) and Wim van den Goorbergh (PhD 1978). In 1988, he retired as Professor of Economics at Tilburg University. On this occasion, Ad Kolnaar described his scientific career in Schouten als wetenschapper (Maandschrift Economie, 52(2), 81-86).

From 1958 to 1992, Schouten was crown member of the Social-Economic Council. He was elected a member of the Royal Netherlands Academy of Arts and Sciences in 1975.

He died on 3 February 2018 at the age of 95.

== Publications ==
Schouten authored and co-authored numerous publications. A selection from his books includes:

- 1952. De sociale verzekering in de volkshuishouding. With Gerard Veldkamp. Amsterdam : Veen.
- 1957. Exacte economie : een samenvatting van de economische theorie in de vorm van tien algemeen-economische modellen. Leiden : Stenfert Kroese.
- 1960. Groeitheorie. With Folkert de Roos. Haarlem : Bohn
- 1967. Dynamische macro-economie. With A.H.J. Kolnaar. Leiden : Stenfert Kroese
- 1980. Macht en Wanorde: een vergelijking van economische stelsels. Leiden: Stenfert Kroese, pp. 1–270.
- 1986. Het Wankele Evenwicht in de Economie. Leiden: Stenfert Kroese.

Articles, a selection:

- Schouten, D. B. J., and J. Lips. "National accounts and policy models." Review of Income and Wealth 4.1 (1955): 78-100.
