= Hugo Keuzenkamp =

Dutch economist and administrator

Hugo Albert Keuzenkamp (born 30 May 1961) is a Dutch economist, administrator, and Professor of Insurance Studies at Faculty of Economics and Business of the University of Amsterdam.

== Biography ==
Born in Rijswijk, Keuzenkamp received his Doctoral (BA + MA) in Economics at the University of Amsterdam in 1986, his MA in Economics at the London School of Economics in 1987. He started his PhD research at Duke University in 1987, which he completed at the Tilburg University in 1994, receiving his PhD with a thesis entitled "Probability, econometrics and truth: a treatise on the foundations of econometric inference".

During his studies Keuzenkamp was research assistant from 1984 to 1986 for Wim Driehuis at SEO Economic Research; in 1987 for Lawrence Summers at the Centre for Labour Economics of the London School of Economics; in 1987 for Neil de Marchi at the Department of Economics of the Duke University; and in 1988 for Lawrence Summers at Harvard University. Back in the Netherlands at the Tilburg University he became Assistant Professor in 1990, and Associate Professor in 1999. In Amsterdam from 2000 to 2004 he was director of SEO Economic Research as successor of Bernard van Praag. In 2004 was appointed part-time Professor at Department of Quantitative Economics, Faculty of Economics and Business of the University of Amsterdam.

In 2004 Keuzenkamp was also appointed Director of Healthcare Insurance at the Delta Lloyd Group. In 2007 he became board member at the Westfries Gasthuis hospital in Hoorn.

Beside his numerous administrative activities Keuzenkamp was ghostwriter for Wim Kok in 1993, columnist for Het Parool and De Financiële Telegraaf, and Editor-in-chief for the Economisch Statistische Berichten. In 1987 he was awarded the Fulbright Award and the Bronfenbrenner Fellowship of Duke University

== Publications ==
Keuzenkamp authored and co-authored over 35 publications in the field of economics and organizational theory. Books, a selection:

- 1987. Probability, econometrics and truth: a treatise on the foundations of econometric inference. Proefschrift Katholieke Universiteit Brabant Tilburg.
- 2000. Probability, econometrics and truth: the methodology of econometrics. Cambridge University Press.
- 2001. Simplicity, inference and modelling: Keeping it sophisticatedly simple. With Arnold Zellner and Michael McAleer, eds. Cambridge University Press.

Articles, a selection:

- Keuzenkamp, Hugo A. "A precursor to Muth: Tinbergen's 1932 model of rational expectations." The Economic Journal 101.408 (1991): 1245-1253.
- Keuzenkamp, Hugo A., and Michael McAleer. "Simplicity, scientific inference and econometric modelling." The Economic Journal (1995): 1-21.
- Keuzenkamp, Hugo A., and Jan R. Magnus. "On tests and significance in econometrics." Journal of Econometrics 67.1 (1995): 5-24.
- Keuzenkamp, Hugo A., and Anton P. Barten. "Rejection without falsification on the history of testing the homogeneity condition in the theory of consumer demand." Journal of Econometrics 67.1 (1995): 103-127.
