= Théodore Limperg =

Dutch accountant

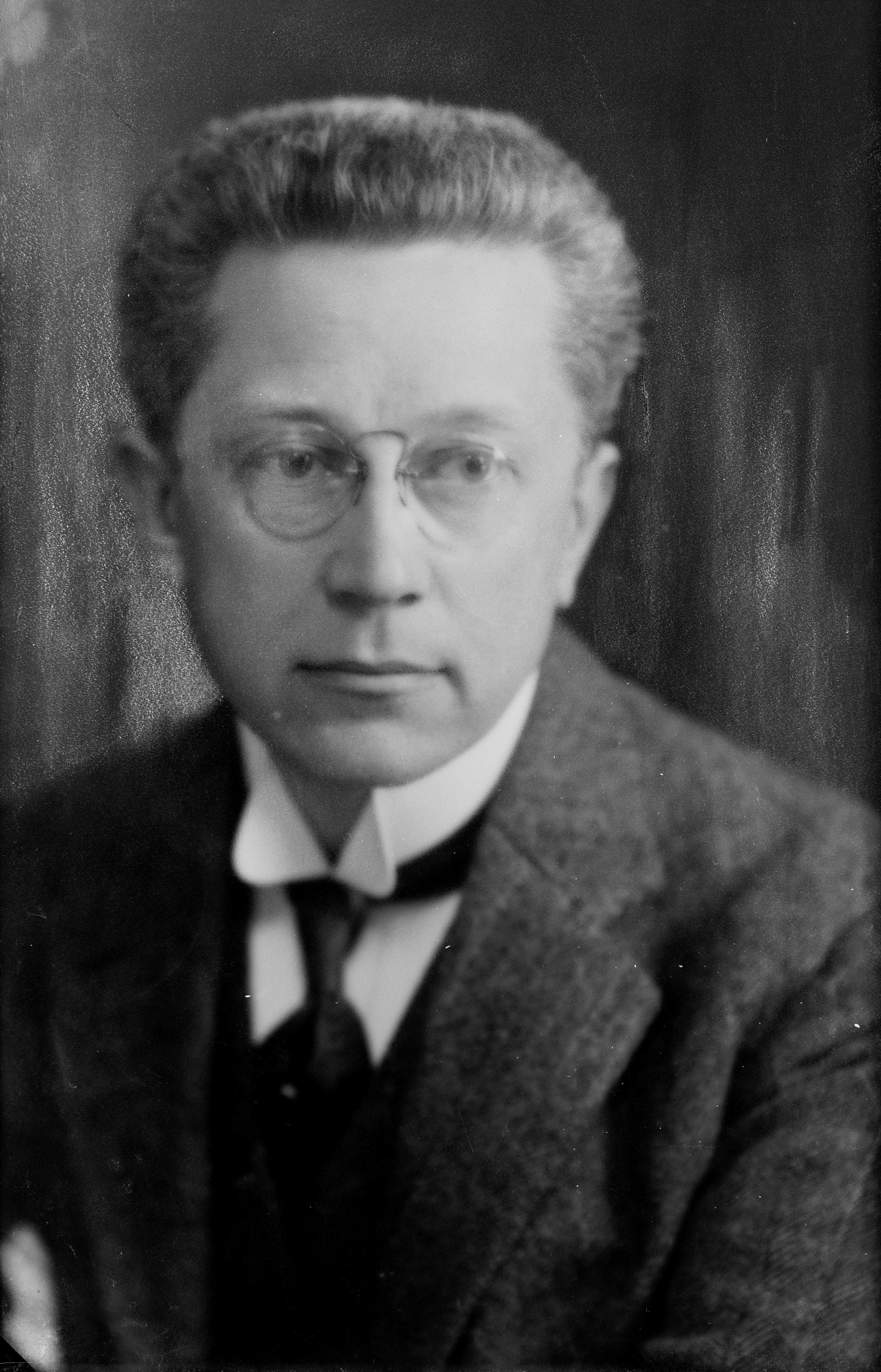
Theodore Limperg ca. 1930

Théodore Limperg jr. (Amsterdam, December 21, 1879 – Amsterdam, December 6, 1961) was a Dutch accountant, and Professor in Business economics at the University of Amsterdam. He is particularly known for his contribution to the international debate about replacement costs in the 1920s.

== Biography ==
Théodore Limperg was born late 1879 as the son of Theodorus Limperg, chief administrative officer in Amsterdam, and Mathilda Speijer. Because his father's first name and his were almost alike, he called himself Th. Limperg jr. throughout his life. He graduated in 1897 at the Commercial High School, and in 1900 obtained a teaching licence in accounting. In the same year he started his training to become Chartered Accountant at the Dutch Institute of Accountants (Nederlands Instituut van Accountants NIvA), predecessor of the Nederlands Instituut van Registeraccountants (NIVRA), and acquired his degree in 1904.

Limperg had started working as assistant accountant to gain practical experience. In 1901 he was admitted to the Netherlands Institute of Accountants, and joined the accountancy firm Volmer & Co as member. Some years later with his younger brother, who had become auditor, he founded the firm Th. and L. Limperg. This company merged in 1970 with Moret, De Jong & Starke to Moret & Limperg, which eventually merged into Ernst & Young. In 1922 Limperg was appointed Professor of Business Economics at the Municipal University of Amsterdam, nowadays University of Amsterdam. He ended his work as practicing accountant at the firm Th. and L. Limperg. In addition to his professorship he served in various administrative and advisory positions.

During World War II within the Senate of the Municipal University of Amsterdam, he was one of the leading figures in the resistance against the Germans. He was dismissed from his post in April 1943 and was forced into hiding. His son, the architect Koen Limperg, belonged to the resistance group that organised the attack on the Amsterdam Resident registration office in 1943. He was later captured and executed 1 July 1943 in Overveen.

After the Liberation Limperg took up his professorship again, and served another five years until his retirement in 1950.

Limperg married twice: In 1906 with Emma Altink (deceased in 1947), and in 1953 with Marguerite Isabelle Marie Goossens. He had three children. Besides Koen he had a son Theo, who was a lawyer and specialized in copyright law, and a daughter Emmy, first economics teacher and later lecturer in Wageningen.

== Work ==
Limpergs ideas on auditing and accounting are considered of great significance for the development of auditing, accounting and business economics. However, he sparingly published. His collected works was largely compiled from college notes made by his disciples. Limperg's economic theories have become known through the writings of his students, especially through the work of Salomon Kleerekoper. Limperg has been named 'patriarch of the Dutch accountants.' The cornerstone of his work on auditing was his Theory of Inspired Confidence, also known as the Auditing Theory of Rational Expectations (translation by Hans Blokdijk). This theory from 1933, with reliable translation into English in 1985, was used as blueprint in establishing the Public Company Accounting Oversight Board. The cornerstone of his work on accounting was his theory about replacement value.

=== Accountancy ===
Limperg wanted to bring the accountancy practice and theory on a higher level. He published a series of articles starting in 1905 in the newly established Accountancy journal about the future direction of the profession, and its requirements. Another focus was on the relationship between accountancy and society. Limperg argued, that auditor reports should not only be prepared for direct clients, but for anyone who wants to take notice. The auditor should be the 'vertrouwenspersoon van het maatschappelijk verkeer'( can be translated as the 'trusted third party on behalf of society')

In 1905 he became editor-in-chief at the Accountancy journal. In his articles he criticized the Nederlands Instituut van Accountants NIvA (Dutch Institute of Chartered Accountants), of which he was a member as well. The institute didn't take this for granted. When the board of the institute came into conflict with a fellow member, J.G.Ch. Volmer, Limperg chose his side. This led to Limperg's Niva expulsion at the end of 1906. Many other members followed him and left Niva. In the same year these dissidents jointly founded the Nederlandsche Accountants-Vereeniging NAV (Dutch Accountants Institute).

In the years following Limperg would shape the organization a model accountancy organization. The Accountancy journal became the prime magazine of the association. The Nederlandsche Accountants-Vereeniging upheld stringent entrance requirements, and conducted its own examinations. A disciplinary board supervised the conduct of its members. The Nederlandsche Accountants-Vereeniging eventually merged into the Nederlands Instituut van Accountants in 1919. With the merge the new methods, quality standards for membership and the disciplinary board, became standard practice.

In 1923 after a dispute with the publisher Limperg started a new monthly accountancy magazine, entitled Maandblad voor Accountancy en Bedrijfseconomie (MAB), which still exists nowadays.

=== Trade Education ===
Beside the accountancy profession, Limperg campaigned for quality improvement of the Dutch business education and trade education on an academic level in a separate university. In 1913 he got his way, when in Rotterdam the Netherlands School of Commerce was founded, which in 1973 became the Erasmus University Rotterdam. In 1921 in the University of Amsterdam a new Faculteit der Handelswetenschappen (Faculty of Trade science) got started, which would become the Faculty of Economics and Econometrics.

Limperg would bear his mark on the organization and growth of the new faculty. He proposed additional auditor training, which started in 1929, and proposed to change its name to Faculty of Economics, which was implemented in 1935. Since 1987 it is named Faculty of Economics and Econometrics. Limperg was the standard bearer of the 'Amsterdam school' which aimed to develop a comprehensive and internally consistent theory of the business enterprise based on a few fundamental economic axioms. This contrasted with the approach taken in Rotterdam which was of a more practice-oriented and pragmatic nature.

=== Replacement value ===
In his days, buildings, machinery and inventories on the balance sheet were traditionally valued at historical costs; the costs paid to produce or to purchase the item. Another, better picture of the value can be determined based on replacement costs; the price one would pay to produce or to purchase the item. As a consequence, the assets of the company should be regularly reassessed. That provides a revaluation reserve, which is part of equity.

This idea didn't originate with Limperg: high inflation during and following the First World War had created awareness in many countries of the limitations of cost-based accounting. In a situation of high inflation, high profits may be reported on the sale of inventory acquired at lower price levels, but if the firm has to replace the sold inventory at higher prices in order to remain in business, the high profits do not reflect the firm's structural profitability. These inflated profit numbers are therefore not a good guide to making economic decisions. Limperg developed this practical observation into a general theory of value and profit.

In his theory of value, he posited that the value of an asset to its owner is the lowest of its replacement cost and the value it may generate when sold or used to produce other output for sale. If the replacement cost of an asset is higher than the value it may generate, it is not economically rational to replace the asset when sold or used. It may still be rational to continue to use the asset to the end of its useful life, but until then its value will be based on the value it may generate, not on replacement cost. Conversely, when the replacement cost of an asset is lower than the value it may generate, it is economically rational to replace it when sold or used. This makes the replacement cost the relevant measure of the value of the asset to the firm, because this value will represent the economic sacrifice the firm makes when exchanging the asset for another asset or cash, when using it to produce inventory for sale. This value concept, as well as the underlying reasoning, closely resembles the concept of deprival value developed in the English-language accounting literature since the 1930s.

From this theory of value, Limperg derived his theory of profit. The expenses to be deducted from sales revenue when determining profit should be based on the value of assets sold or used in production. 'Value' would normally equal replacement cost because the normal situation in a business is one of going concern. This is why in practice, Limperg's theory is often referred to as 'replacement value theory'. However, he was careful to point out that the theory was based on a more general value concept. A central assumption in Limperg's theory of profit is that the main function of profit calculation in a firm is to determine the amount of distributable profit, e.g. the payment of dividends in a limited liability company. The criterion for profit distribution, according to Limperg, is that it should leave the productive capacity of the firm intact, as long as this is economically rational. This again points to the use of replacement cost: if replacement is to take place at higher prices than historical cost, the firm should not pay out funds to owners that will be needed to finance the replacement. A consequence of this view is that value increases are not recognized as profit even when realized through sale or depreciation of the asset. These increases remain part of an undistributable revaluation reserve as long as the firm expects to continue to replace the assets.

Limperg's ideas had a decisive influence on the method of cost calculation and determination of profit in several Dutch companies, including Philips until 1992.

Until 2015, and reflecting the influence of Limperg's views on value and profit, Dutch company law offered a choice for most assets between valuation at historical cost and valuation at replacement cost. Under the influence of European legislation, the scope of the option was reduced. While revaluation of some assets is still allowed, the value concepts to be used no longer relate to Limperg's value theory.

International Financial Reporting Standards (IFRS) contain an echo of Limperg's views. IAS 16 Property, plant and equipment allows a choice between measurement at cost and at fair value. If the fair value option is chosen, value increases are not recognized as profit, and depreciation expense is calculated based on the revalued amount. The value increases recognized in equity outside profit or loss are not recognized as profit when realized.

=== Notable students of Limperg ===
Some of the most noted students of Limperg.

- Abraham Mey (1890-1971), professor at the University of Amsterdam
- Salomon Kleerekoper (1893-1970), professor at the University of Amsterdam
- Henri Johan van der Schroeff (1900-1974), professor at the University of Amsterdam
- Jacob Louis Mey (1900-1966), professor at University of Groningen until 1964 and then Technische Universiteit Delft
- Jacobus Franciscus Haccoû (1903-1972), professor at the University of Amsterdam
- Louis Jacques Zimmerman (1913-1998), professor at the University of Amsterdam
- Joop Klant (1915-1994), professor at the University of Amsterdam, also a prose writer
- Gerard Leonard Groeneveld (1904-1989), professor at the Catholic University Tilburg, delivered the collected works of Limperg

Because many proponents of Limperg's theories taught at the University of Amsterdam (like Limperg himself), they are often called the "Amsterdam School" of accountancy.

=== Political views ===
Limperg can be seen in many ways as a social democrat. He didn't emphasize his political views too much, to uphold his position as scientist, but he was politically engaged. In November 1938 he co-authored with fourteen others (among them the later Minister of Finance Piet Lieftinck), an open letter to the government regarding the policy of public finance. The manifesto opposed the conservative politics promoted by the direct advisers to the government, and called for a more active economic policy. Limperg also espoused the Plan van de Arbeid (Labor Plan), a plan to combat the economical crisis, drawn up by Hein Vos and Jan Tinbergen in the early thirties.

After the Second World War Limperg took a seat in the Board of Trustees of the scientific department of the Nederlands Verbond van Vakverenigingen (Dutch Trade Union Confederation).

== Recognition ==
The work of Limperg received much acknowledgements. In 1935 he was appointed honorary president of the Comité International de l'Organisation Scientifique. The Netherlands School of Commerce (now Erasmus University Rotterdam) awarded him an honorary doctorate in 1947. In 1950 he received the Wallace Clark Medal for his international contribution to scientific management.

The Dutch inter-university institute for accountancy bears his name: Limperg Institute. This institute, in which five universities and the Nederlandse Beroepsorganisatie van Accountants (NBA), the Dutch association of auditors, cooperate, coordinates the Dutch postgraduate accountancy courses. The Institute organizes the annual Limperg Day, where the Limperg Medal is awarded to an individual, who has made a significant contribution to scientific research in the fields of accounting and auditing.
