= Haccou =

Haccou or Haccoû is a surname. Notable people with the surname include:

- Johannes Cornelis Haccou (1798 - 1839), Dutch painter
- Jacobus Franciscus Haccoû (1903 - 1972), Dutch economist
- Patricia Haccou (born 1957), Dutch mathematician
- Tobias Haccou (born 1999), Dutch ISSF athlete
