= Theo van de Klundert =

Dutch economist (1936–2024)

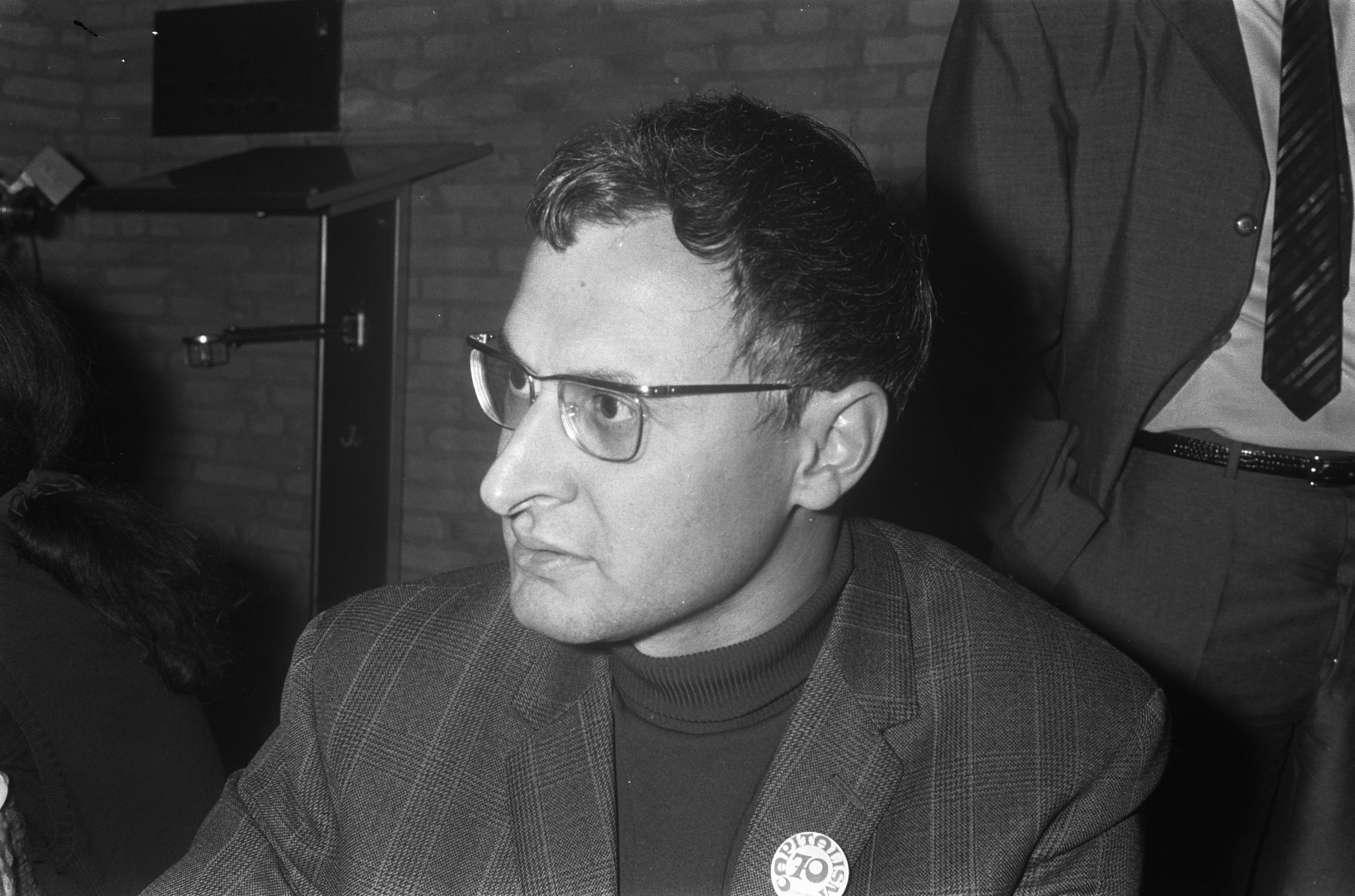
- Van de Klundert in 1970
- Born: 27 February 1936; Herwen en Aerdt, Netherlands
- Died: 6 December 2024 (aged 88); Oisterwijk, Netherlands

Academic background
- Education: Tilburg University

Academic work
- Discipline: Economics
- Institutions: Tilburg University

Theodorus Cornelis Michael Josephus (Theo) van de Klundert (27 February 1936 – 6 December 2024) was a Dutch economist, and Professor of Economics at Tilburg University.

== Life and career ==
Born in Herwen en Aerdt, van de Klundert received his PhD (cum laude) in 1962 at Tilburg University under supervision of Dirk Bernard Joseph Schouten with a thesis entitled "Groei en inkomensverdeling" (Growth and Income Distribution).

After his graduation, van de Klundert started working at the Staatsmijnen in Limburg (State Mining Corporation) for a short time. He realized he had other ambitions and moved to Stanford University. In 1964 van de Klundert was appointed Professor of Economics and History of Economics at Tilburg University. In 2001, van de Klundert retired from Tilburg University. Van de Klundert died on 6 December 2024, at the age of 88.

From 1967, van de Klundert was associated with the scientific journal De Economist, initially as editor, later on as chairman of the board of editors. From 1976 he was also active as researcher and consultant for the CPB Bureau for Economic Policy Analysis.

Van de Klundert became a member of the Royal Netherlands Academy of Arts and Sciences in 1994.

Van de Klundert died on 6 December 2024, at the age of 88.

== Work ==
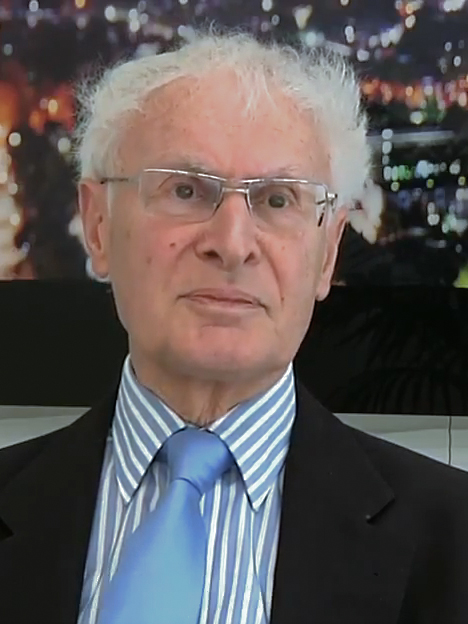
Van de Klundert in 2013

Van de Klundert's research interests were both in the field of macroeconomics and microeconomics. According to Van Gemert et al. (1989) his scientific work was dominated by the four themes "(1) growth and income distribution, (2) capital theory, resource economics and trade, (3) controversies between Keynesians and neoclassicists, and (4) open economy macroeconomics."

== Publications ==
Van de Klundert authored and co-authored several publications. A selection from his many books includes:

- 1962. Groei en inkomensverdeling. Leiden: Stenfert Kroese
- 1968. Grondslagen van de economische analyse. Amsterdam: De Bussy
- 1979. Over macht en wet in het economisch gebeuren: opstellen aangeboden aan Prof. Dr. D.B.J. Schouten bij zijn 25-jarig jubileum als hoogleraar in de Algemene Leer en Geschiedenis van de Economie aan de Katholieke Hogeschool. With Wim van den Goorbergh and Ad Kolnaar eds. Leiden: Stenfert Kroese
- 1974. Inleiding tot de micro-economische theorie: allocatie en prijsvorming. With R.J. de Groof. Amsterdam: De Bussy.
- 1997. Groei en instituties. Tilburg: Tilburg University Press
- 2001. Growth theory in historical perspective: selected essays of Theo van de Klundert. With Sjak Smulders ed. Cheltenham: Elgar
- 2005. Vormen van Kapitalisme: Markten, Instituties, Macht. Utrecht: Lemma
- 2013. Capitalism and Democracy: A Fragile Alliance. Edward Elgar.
