= Heertje =

Heertje is a Dutch surname. Notable people with the surname include:

- Arnold Heertje (1934–2020), Dutch economist, writer and columnist
- Raoul Heertje (born 1963), Dutch comedian and son of Arnold Heertje
