= Jules Theeuwes =

Belgian economist (1944–2012)

Jules Jacobus Maria Theeuwes (10 October 1944 – 6 November 2012) was a Belgian economist, and Professor of Labour Economics at the University of Amsterdam.

== Biography ==
Born in Noorderwijk, Belgium, Theeuwes received his BA in Trade and Consular Studies at the University of Antwerp in 1967, his MA in Economics at the Katholieke Universiteit Leuven in 1970, and his PhD at the University of British Columbia in 1975.

After graduation Theeuwes back in Belgium he was researcher at the Center for Operations Research and Econometrics in Louvain in 1975-76. In 1976 he moved to the Netherlands, where from 1976 to 1985 he was associate professor at the Erasmus University Rotterdam, and in between Visiting Professor at University of British Columbia in the year 1978-79. After one year 1985-86 at the University of Amsterdam in 1986 he was appointed Professor of Economics at the Leiden Law School of the Leiden University. In 1996 back in Amsterdam he was appointed Professor of Labour Economics at the University of Amsterdam. From 2006 to 2009 he was director of SEO Economic Research as successor of Coen Teulings. In 2010 he retired at the University of Amsterdam and in 2012 he died in Rotterdam.

Theeuwes was Visiting Professor at the University of Wisconsin-Madison in 1988, and at Stanford University in 1996. He was Fellow at the Netherlands Institute for Advanced Study (NIAS) in 1990-91, and member of the Scientific Council for Government Policy from 2002 to 2006.

== Publications ==
Theeuwes has authored and co-authored numerous publications. Books, a selection:

- 1993. Labour Market Contracts and Institutions: A Cross-national Comparison: Papers Presented at the International Workshop for Labour Market Contracts and Institutions at the Netherlands Institute for Advanced Studies (NIAS), Wassenaar, the Netherlands. Vol. 218. With Joost Hartog eds. Emerald Group Pub Limited.

Articles, a selection:

- Lindeboom, Maarten, and Jules Theeuwes. Job Duration in the Netherlands: The Co-existence of High Turnover and Permanent Job Attachment. Oxford Bulletin of Economics and Statistics 53.3 (1991): 243-264.
- Lindeboom, Maarten, and Jules Theeuwes. "Search, benefits and entitlement." Economica (1993): 327-346.
- Wottiez, Isolde, and Jules Theeuwes. "9 Well-being and labor market status." The distribution of welfare and household production: International perspectives (1998): 211.
- Kerkhofs, Marcel, Maarten Lindeboom, and Jules Theeuwes. "Retirement, financial incentives and health." Labour Economics 6.2 (1999): 203-227.
