= Sustainable national income =

Sustainable national income, (SNI) is an indicator for environmental sustainability, which gives an estimate of the production level at which - with the technology in the year of calculation - environmental functions remain available ‘for ever’.

== Overview ==
The national income of a country is an estimate of the yearly production of goods and services. The loss of possible uses of the non-human made physical surroundings, named environmental functions, on which humanity is dependent in all its doings remains outside the estimate. Also the present and future production is dependent on these environmental functions.

The sustainable national income (SNI) in a given year is an estimate of the production level at which - with the technology in the year of calculation - environmental functions remain available ‘for ever’. The sustainable national income (SNI) in a certain year is defined as:

the maximum attainable production level whereby, with the available technology in the year of calculation, vital environmental functions remain available ‘for ever’.

The production level in the same year that is registered in the standard national income (NI) does not meet this condition. Environmental functions and their preservation after all fall outside the NI. The NI is therefore always higher than the SNI. The difference gives information about the distance between the present production level and the production level in a sustainable situation. If the distance decreases then we are on the road to environmental sustainability, the part of the production that is based on unsustainable use of the environment decreases. If the distance increases then we are drifting further away from sustainability.

== History ==
The original concept of ´sustainability´ refers to an equilibrium relation between human activities and their physical surroundings and has a long tradition going back to the nineteenth century. The sustainable national income is based on a definition of sustainability in conformity with this. The original concept of sustainability is introduced in the international discussion by 1980 publication of “The World Conservation Strategy” of 1980

Since the publication of “Our Common Future” in 1987 one has started to include in sustainability besides a sustainable use of the physical surroundings also elements that conflict with this, such as the growth of production as measured in the national income and some social measures. By taking together environmental conservation and herewith conflicting goals in one and the same sustainability indicator the development of the state of the environment is being obscured. Moreover, there are examples of measures that worked socially advantageous in the short term but disastrous in the long term because of impairment of vital environmental functions. Arguments in support of this and some historical examples are given in the publications of Hueting and Reijnders (2004) and De Boer and Hueting for the OECD (2004) mentioned below.

The theoretical and practical framework of the Sustainable national income is developed by the economist Roefie Hueting. Already in 1970 he published a collection of articles over the years 1967-1970 titled: “What is nature worth to us?” . His 1974 Ph.D. thesis was entitled “New scarcity and economic growth: More welfare through less production?” In 1969 Hueting founded the Department of Environmental Statistics at Statistics Netherlands. A multidisciplinary team of biologists, chemists, physicists, electrical engineers and economists worked for nearly forty years on the SNI and the environmental statistics on what it is based.

== Sustainable national income topics ==
=== Environmental functions ===
Central to the sustainable national income (SNI) is the concept of environmental function. Environmental functions are defined as the possible uses of our non-human made physical surroundings, on which humanity is entirely dependent in all its doings, whether they be producing, consuming, breathing or recreating.

When use of one function is at the expense of another or the same function or threatens to be so in the future, there is competition of functions. As an illustration, once water pollutant thresholds have been exceeded, use of the function ‘dumping ground for waste’ may come to compete with the function ‘drinking water’. Competing functions are by definition scarce and consequently economic goods. Today most of the functions of our physical surroundings, which once were free goods, have become scarce goods.

=== Transition to environmental sustainability ===
With the present technology, population size as well as production and consumption patterns, the sustainable situation governments say they strive for cannot be reached. Given the distance to be bridged, achieving environmental sustainability will require a fairly long period. Besides many environmental measures have a time lag, sometimes of a few decades. The length of the period of the transition path to a sustainable situation is only limited by the condition that vital environmental functions must not be irreparably damaged.

In view of the threat that this may happen it seems urgent to wait no longer with a change of course in the direction of sustainability. On account of the precautionary principle no technological progress during the transition period is anticipated. This is measured afterwards on the basis of the development of the distance (écart) between the SNI and the NI in the course of time.

=== Estimates ===
The work on the estimate of an SNI started in the mid-1960s. The first rough estimate of an ‘SNI’ for the world by Jan Tinbergen and Roefie Hueting in 1991 arrived at 50 percent of the world production level: the sustainable world income.

A much more advanced estimate for The Netherlands was made in 2001 by a collaboration of the National Institute for Public Health and Environment (RIVM), Statistics Netherlands (CBS) and the Institute for Environmental Studies (IVM). The estimate arrived at around 50 percent of the production level, c.q. the national income of The Netherlands. This corresponds with the production level of the beginning of the 1970s. As the population was smaller at that time, the consumption per person was substantially higher than 50 percent of the present level.

In accordance with the principles of the SNI it is assumed that all countries in the world simultaneously switch over to environmental sustainability and that the costs thereof are comparable with those of The Netherlands. In the period 1990-2000 the distance between de NI and SNI increased with approximately 10 billion euros.

== Reviews ==
Neoclassical economics finds opposition from ecological economics, while that opposition would be less needed due to Hueting's more neoclassical analysis of the environment. The neoclassical SNI has different results than e.g. Robert Costanza et al. (1997).

A critical review of the method used by Robert Costanza et al. (1997) is given by Roefie Hueting et al. (1998).
