= SEO Economic Research =

Dutch economic institute

SEO Amsterdam Economics
- Founded: 1949
- Type: Economic research institute
- Location: Amsterdam, Netherlands
- Affiliations: University of Amsterdam
- Website: https://www.seo.nl/en/home/

SEO Amsterdam Economics (SEO) is an independent economic research institute based in Amsterdam, the Netherlands. The institute conducts applied economic research commissioned by government ministries, businesses, and other public and private organisations.

SEO was founded in 1949 within the Faculty of Economics of the University of Amsterdam. Although it remains formally affiliated with the university, it operates as an independent institute. Until 2005, it was known as Stichting voor Economisch Onderzoek der Universiteit van Amsterdam ("Foundation for Economic Research of the University of Amsterdam").

== Research areas ==
SEO Amsterdam Economics conducts applied research in several fields of economics. Some of its main research areas include:

- Labour markets and employment
- Education and human capital
- Energy and sustainability
- Health economics
- Public policy and taxation

== List of directors ==
The following individuals have served as managing directors of SEO Amsterdam Economics since its foundation in 1949.

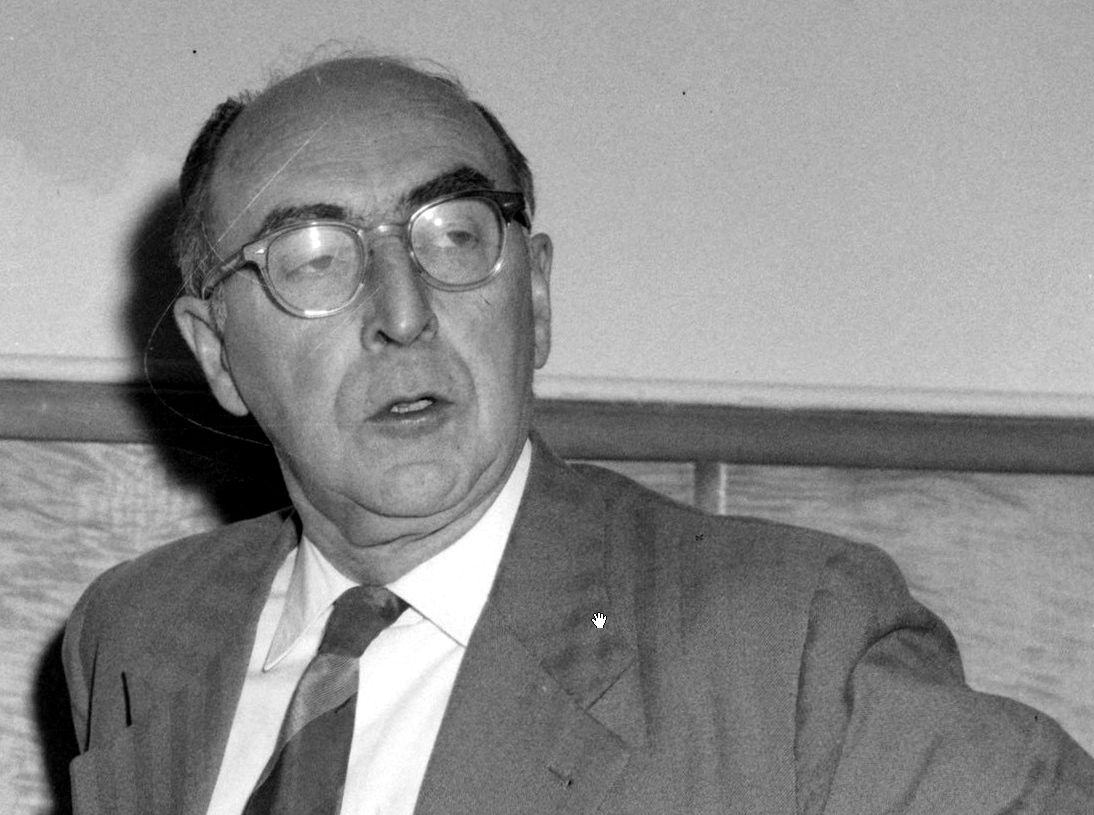
J. F. Haccou, 1959.

1950–1966	Jacobus Franciscus Haccoû
1966-1975	Joop Klant
1975-1977	Anton Julius Butter (Deputy Director)
1977-1979	Jan Lambooy and Christoffel Abraham Koopman
1979-1985	Wim Driehuis
1985-1992	Mars Cramer
1992-2000	Bernard van Praag
2000-2004	Hugo Keuzenkamp
2004-2006	Coen Teulings
2006-2009	Jules Theeuwes
2009–2016	Barbara Baarsma
2016–present	Bas ter Weel
