= Ad Kolnaar =

Dutch economist (born 1942)

Adrianus Herman Josef (Ad) Kolnaar (born 16 August 1942) is a Dutch economist, and Emeritus Professor at Tilburg University.

== Biography ==
Born in Hengelo, Overijssel, Kolnaar started to study Business Econometrics at Tilburg University in 1959. Here, he received his MSc (cum laude) in 1964, and in 1969 his PhD (also cum laude) for the thesis "Werktijdverkorting en dynamiek" (Reduction in Working Hours and Dynamics) under supervision of Dirk Bernard Joseph Schouten.

In 1965, Kolnaar started his academic career as Associate Professor at Tilburg University. In 1971, he was appointed Professor in Economics and the History of Economics. From 1972 to 1988, he was a board member of the Economic Institute Tilburg (EIT). From 1974 to 1976, he was also Dean of the Faculty of Economics, and in 1975, for nine months, Rector Magnificus of Tilburg University. From 1988 to 1996, he was Director of the Economic Institute Tilburg (EIT). His doctoral students were Anton van Nunen (1990), Martin van Tuijl (1993), Jan Donders (1993) and Humphrey ter Horst (1996). In August 2007, he retired from Tilburg University.

From 1978 to 1980, Kolnaar was member of the Scientific Council for Government Policy, from 1986 to 2006 crown member of the Social-Economic Council.

== Publications ==
Kolnaar has published numerous books and articles. A selection of his books includes:

- 1967. Dynamische macro-economie. With D.B.J. Schouten. Leiden : Stenfert Kroese
- 1969. Werktijdverkorting en dynamiek. Doctoral thesis Tilburg University.
- 1979. Over macht en wet in het economisch gebeuren : opstellen aangeboden aan Prof. Dr. D.B.J. Schouten bij zijn 25-jarig jubileum als hoogleraar in de Algemene Leer en Geschiedenis van de Economie aan de Katholieke Hogeschool. With Wim van den Goorbergh and Theo van de Klundert eds. Leiden : Stenfert Kroese
- 1985 Dynamische Macro-Economie Deel I Vraagtheorie. Stenfert Kroese, Leiden.
- 1985 Dynamische Macro-Economie Deel II Aanbodtheorie. Stenfert Kroese, Leiden.

A selection from his articles includes:

- Kolnaar, A.H.J.J. (1967). Empirie, technische vooruitgang en substitutie. Maandschrift Economie, 31(8), 438-450
- Kolnaar, A.H.J.J. (1973). Lange termijn doelstellingen en investeringscriteria of de tegenstelling in het kapitalisme. Maandschrift Economie, 37, 370–433.
- Klundert, van de, T.C.M.J., and A.H.J.J. Kolnaar. LDCs versus DCs: Trade and growth. Journal of Economic Studies, 1982(9), 36–50.
- Schouten, D.B.J., en A.H.J.J. Kolnaar (1983). De tekortschietende jaren tachtig. Maandschrift Economie, 47, 512–525.
- Kolnaar, A.H.J. and A.M. van Nunen, "A two-sector model of a closed static economy with labour market." Economic Modelling, 10.3 (1993): 201–216.
- Tuijl, Martin A. van, Robert J. de Groof, and Ad H.J. Kolnaar. "Fiscal policy and public capital in interdependent economies." Economic Modelling 14.2 (1997): 279–300.
