= Mars Cramer =

Dutch economist (1928–2014)

Jan S. Cramer
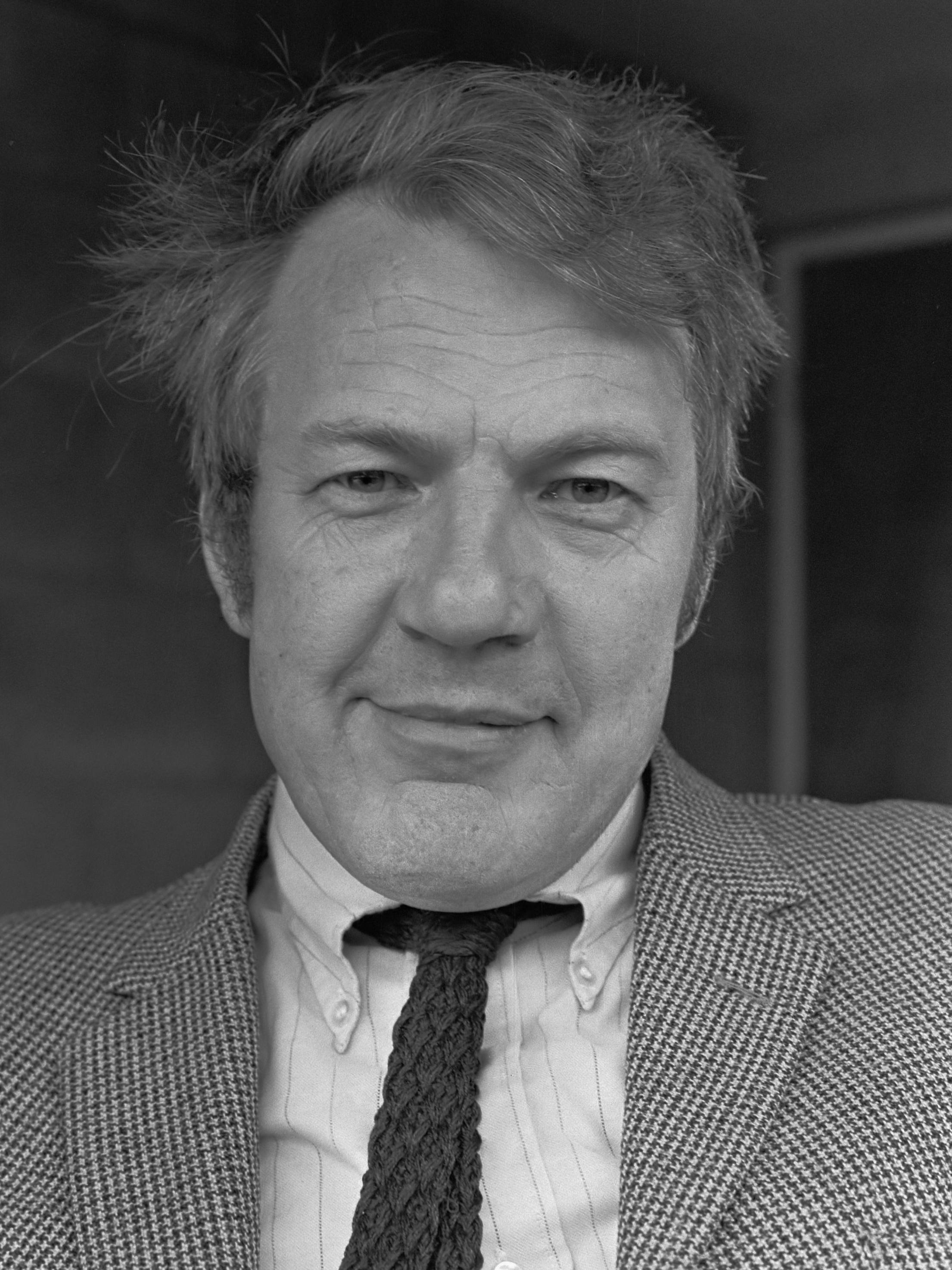
- Mars Cramer, 1972
- Born: 28 April 1926; The Hague, Netherlands
- Died: 15 March 2014 (aged 85); Amsterdam, Netherlands

Academic background
- Influences: Pieter de Wolff

Academic work
- Discipline: Econometrics
- Institutions: University of Amsterdam
- Website: Information at IDEAS / RePEc

Jan Salomon (Mars) Cramer (28 April 1928 – 15 March 2014) was a Dutch economist, Professor of Statistics and Econometrics at the University of Amsterdam, known for his work of empirical econometrics.

== Biography ==
Born in The Hague, Mars Cramer was the son of biologist and Professor P. J. S. Cramer (1879–1952) He received his PhD in Mathematics in 1961 at the University of Amsterdam with a thesis entitled "A Statistical Model of the Ownership of Major Consumer Durables with an Application to some Findings of the 1953 Oxford Savings Survey" under supervision of Pieter de Wolff.

In the 1950s Cramer started his career as researcher for the Bureau for Economic Policy Analysis. After graduation in 1961 at the University of Amsterdam he was appointed Professor of Econometrics, a newly established chair. He was Director of the SEO Economic Research from 1985 to 1992 as successor of Wim Driehuis. Among his doctoral students were Arnold Merkies (1972), Geert Ridder (1987) and Mirjam van Praag (2005).

In 1980 Cramer was elected member of the Royal Netherlands Academy of Arts and Sciences, and later Fellow of the Tinbergen Institute. Cramer died on 15 March 2014 in Amsterdam

The University of Amsterdam's Faculty of Economics and Business (2014) recalled that "Mars was known for his originality and his wit. He possessed a genuine academic curiosity and a rather characteristic style of writing. For example, his research into the velocity of money led him to study the velocity of particular coins. As a student he served as editor of the literary student periodical Propria Cures, and he continued to intermittently publish short stories and opinion pieces. In 2012, the Washington Post published his moving account of his wife Til’s euthanasia four years earlier." Cramer "continued working on new research projects and contributing to the supervision of students until the very last day before his passing."

== Publications ==
Cramer authored and co-authored numerous publications in the field of econometrics. Books, a selection:

- 1958. Economic forecasts and policy. With Henri Theil assisted by J.S. Cramer, H. Moerman, and A. Russchen.
- 1961. A Statistical Model of the Ownership of Major Consumer Durables with an Application to some Findings of the 1953 Oxford Savings Survey.
- 1969. Empirical econometrics. Amsterdam : North-Holland Pub. Co.
- 1991. The logit model: an introduction for economists. London: Edward Arnold.
- 2003. Logit models from economics and other fields. Cambridge University Press, 2003.

Articles, a selection:

- Cramer, Jan Salomon (1987). "Mean and variance of $R^{2}$ in small and moderate samples". Journal of Econometrics. 35 (2): 253–266. doi:10.1016/0304-4076(87)90027-3.
- Cramer, Jan Salomon; Ridder, Geert (1991). "Pooling states in the multinomial logit model". Journal of Econometrics. 47 (2): 267–272. doi:10.1016/0304-4076(91)90102-J.
- Van Praag, C. Mirjam; Cramer, Jan S. (2001). "The roots of entrepreneurship and labour demand: Individual ability and low risk aversion" (PDF). Economica. 68 (269): 45–62. doi:10.1111/1468-0335.00232.
- Cramer, J. S.; Hartog, J.; Jonker, N.; Van Praag, C. M. (2002). "Low risk aversion encourages the choice for entrepreneurship: an empirical test of a truism" (PDF). Journal of Economic Behavior & Organization. 48 (1): 29–36. doi:10.1016/S0167-2681(01)00222-0. S2CID 154481271.
