= Barbara Baarsma =

Dutch economist and university teacher

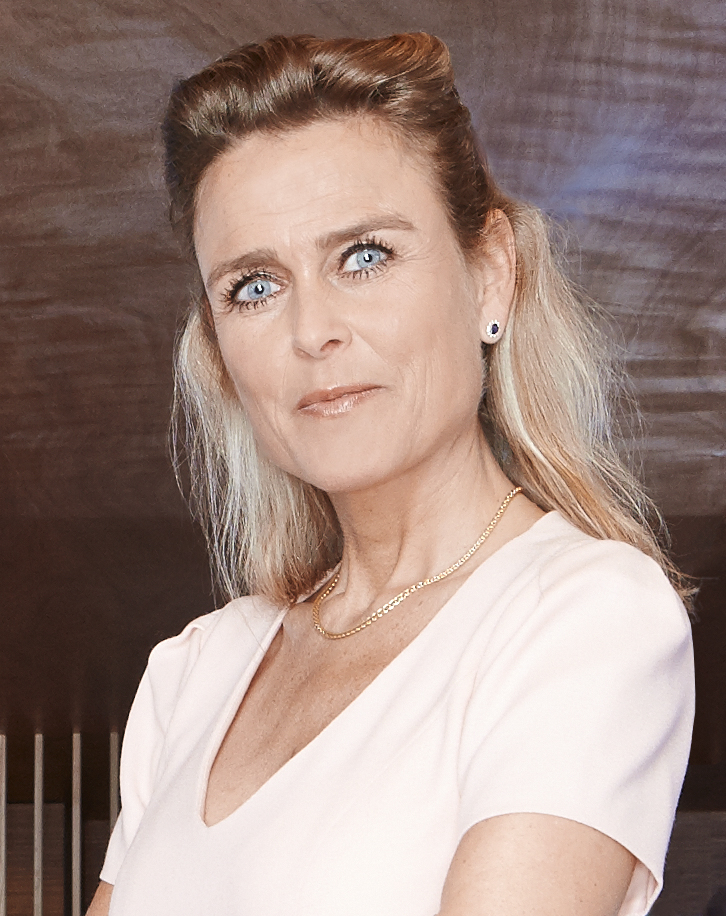
Barbara Baarsma (2014)

Barbara Elisabeth Baarsma (born 19 November 1969) is a Dutch economist, and Professor of Applied Economics at the University of Amsterdam.

== Biography ==
Born in Leiden, Baarsma grew up in Goeree-Overflakkee, where her father was otolaryngologist. After attending the Atheneum in Middelharnis, in 1988 she started studying Industrial Design at the Delft University of Technology. In 1989 she moved to the University of Amsterdam, where she received her MA cum laude in Economics in 1993, and her PhD in economics in 2000 with a thesis entitled "Monetary valuation of environmental goods: Alternatives to contingent valuation" under the supervision of Jan Lambooy and Bernard van Praag.

After graduation in 2000 Baarsma was researcher at SEO Economic Research, where in 2002 she became head of the Cluster Competition and Regulation, in 2008 deputy director, and since 2009 director as successor of Jules Theeuwes. In 2009 she was appointed Professor of Market Forces and Competition at the University of Amsterdam. Since 2014, her chair at the UvA has changed to Applied Economics. In 2012 she was appointed as a Crown member of the Social-Economic Council.

On April 1, 2016, she was appointed Director of Knowledge Development at Rabobank. From January 2019 to March 2021, she was executive chairman of Rabobank Amsterdam. After this, she became director of Rabo Carbon Bank. By the end of 2023, she transferred to PwC, where she is chief economist. She also fulfills various other, social positions. She is chairperson of the DNB Bank Council and a member of the Dutch Committee for Entrepreneurship. Earlier she was a member of the Corporate Governance Monitoring Committee and served as a non executive on several supervisory boards.

== Publications ==
Baarsma has authored and coauthored numerous publications. A selection:

- Baarsma, Barbara Elisabeth (2000). "Monetary valuation of environmental goods: alternatives to contingent valuation".
- Baarsma, Barbara E. (2003). "The valuation of the IJmeer nature reserve using conjoint analysis" (PDF). Environmental and Resource Economics. 25 (3): 343–356. doi:10.1023/A:1024447503683. S2CID 152607179. Archived from the original (PDF) on 2014-05-14.
- Van Praag, Bernard; Baarsma, Barbara E. (2005). "Using Happiness Surveys to Value Intangibles: The Case of Airport Noise*" (PDF). The Economic Journal. 115 (500): 224–246. doi:10.1111/j.1468-0297.2004.00967.x. S2CID 15420943.

In 2022, Baarsma published the book Green Growth (Groene Groei), which examines whether economic growth can be reconciled with achieving climate objectives. In 2024, this was followed by Sustainable Finance (Duurzame Financiering), which explores how the financial sector can steer the transition to a more sustainable economy. Baarsma co-authored this book with Maarten Biermans, also a former Rabobank economist.
