= Roefie Hueting =

Dutch economist (1929–2023)

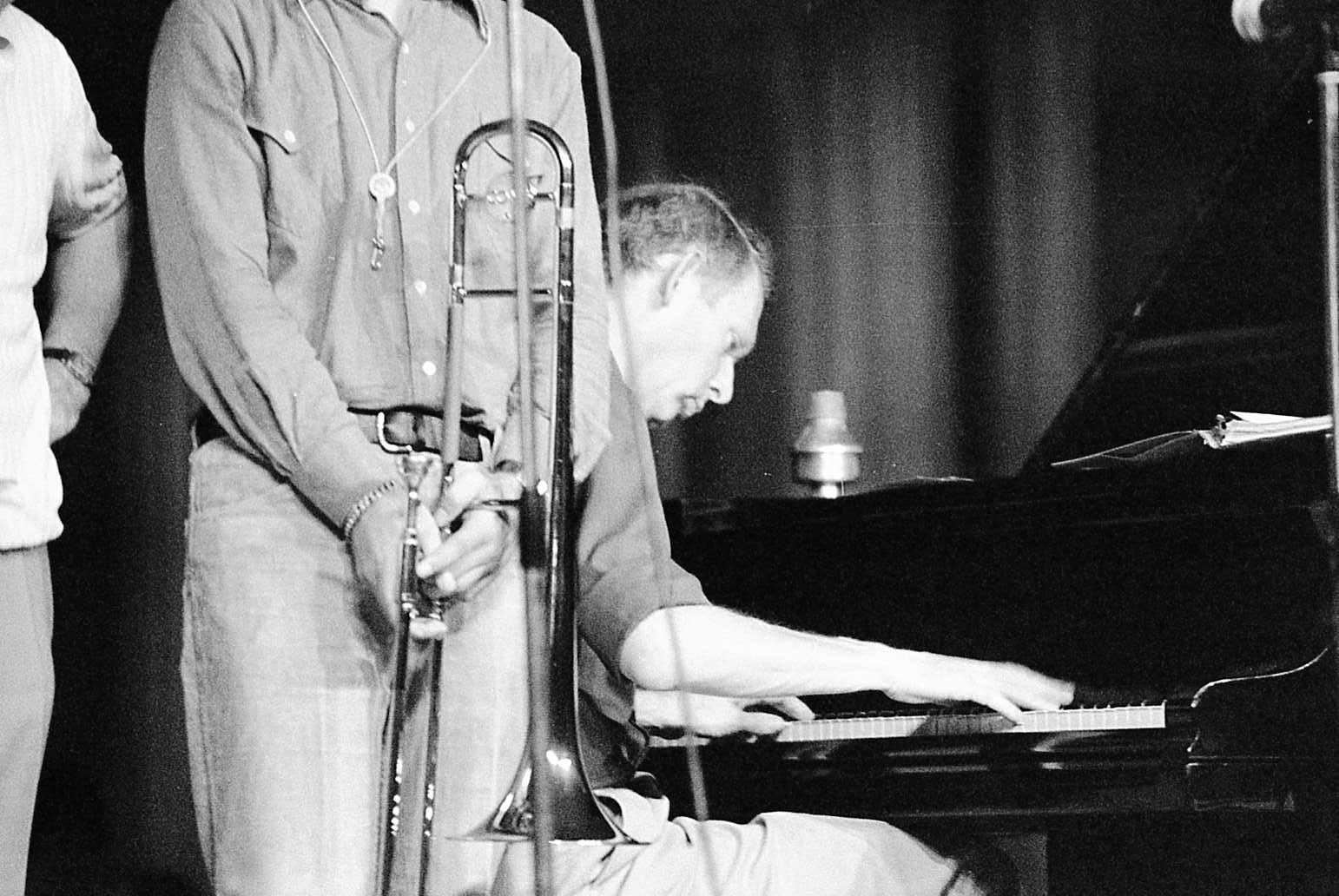
Hueting at the North Sea Jazz Festival in the late 1970s

Roelof (Roefie) Hueting (16 December 1929 – 24 June 2023) was a Dutch economist, former Head of the Department for Environmental Statistics of Statistics Netherlands, pianist and leader of the Down Town Jazz Band, and known for the development of the concept of Sustainable National Income (SNI).

== Biography ==
Hueting was born in The Hague, son of Bernardus Hueting and Elisabeth Hueting-Steinvoorte. In 1949 he founded the Down Town Jazz Band, and earned his living as musician during his studies at the University of Amsterdam which he started in 1951 and received his MA in Economics in 1959. In 1974, he obtained his Ph.D. in economics (cum laude) at the University of Groningen with the thesis "New scarcity and economic growth: More welfare through less production?" under supervision of Jan Pen.

In 1959, he started as assistant public accountant. From 1962 till 1969 he was labour market researcher at the Ministry of Social Affairs, and from 1965 till 1968 at the Ministry of Housing and Physical Planning. After joining the Statistics Netherlands in 1969, he founded its Department of Environmental Statistics. Until his retirement in 1994 he chaired the Department for Environmental Statistics.

In 1991, he was decorated Officer of the Order of Orange-Nassau, and in 1994 awarded the United Nations Global 500 award.

Hueting died in The Hague on 24 June 2023, at the age of 93.

== Work ==
Hueting developed the theoretical and practical framework of the Sustainable national income (SNI). Already in 1970 he published a collection of articles over the years 1967-1970 titled: “What is nature worth to us?”. He has analyzed the environment from the neoclassical point of view of scarcity and developed the concept of Sustainable National Income (SNI). The implication of the SNI is that the statistical measure of economic growth is revised.

=== Economics and the environment ===
The concept of sustainability was presented for the first time at The World Conservation Strategy, IUCN, 1980: "This is the kind of development that provides real improvements in the quality of human life and at the same time conserves the vitality and diversity of the Earth. The goal is development that will be sustainable. Today it may seem visionary but it is attainable. To more and more people it also appears our only rational option". (UNEP, IUCN, WWF)

There are various possible descriptions of this area of research but a good one is provided as follows:

"The increase in human numbers and economic activity has put Homo Sapiens in a position to influence nearly every flow of energy and matter on Earth. Explaining the extent and impacts of this influence is well beyond the theory and analytical tools of individual disciplines, such as economics or ecology. A new interdisciplinary approach is needed, one that unites the relevant aspects of different disciplines...

The theory and tools necessary to understand the relation among human populations, natural resources, the environment, and economic growth are brought together in the discipline of ecological economics. Ecological economics emphasizes the flow of matter and energy among socioeconomic systems and their environment. The methods of ecological economics can be used to provide a more thorough understanding of economy-environment interactions than that offered by a traditional economic analysis"

Examples of ecological suicide are given by Jared Diamond in his book Collapse.

Neoclassical economics finds opposition from ecological economics, while that opposition would be less needed due to Hueting's more neoclassical analysis of the environment. The neoclassical SNI has different results than e.g. Robert Costanza et al. (1997). This suggests that more discipline is required in this discipline.

== Publications ==
Hueting has authored and co-authored numerous published books. A selection:

- 1974. Nieuwe Schaarste en Economische Groei. Amsterdam/Brussel: Agon Elsevier.
- 1980. New scarcity and economic growth. Amsterdam: North-Holland Publishing Company, 1980.
- Roefie Hueting, (1998), The concept of environmental function and its valuation, Ecological Economics, 25
- 2001. Economic Growth and Valuation of the Environment Part 1 With Bart de Boer, Ian Johnson, Joe Stiglitiz and Ekko van Ierland.

Articles, a selection:

- Tinbergen, Jan, and Roefie Hueting. "GNP and market prices: wrong signals for sustainable economic success that mask environmental destruction." Environmentally sustainable economic development: Building on Brundtland (1991): 51–57.
- Hueting, Roefie. "Correcting national income for environmental losses: a practical solution for a theoretical dilemma." National Income and Nature: Externalities, Growth and Steady State. Springer Netherlands, 1992. 23–47.
- Hueting, R. en L. Reijnders (1996) Duurzaamheid is een objectief begrip. ESB, 81(4057), 425
- Hueting, R., Lucas Reijnders, Bart de Boer, Jan Lambooy, Huib Jansen (1998). "The concept of environmental function and its valuation ". Ecological Economics, 25(1), 31–35.
- Hueting, R (2001) ‘Environmental Valuation and Sustainable National Income Accounting’ (with Bart de Boer) and ‘Three Persistent Myths in the Environmental Debate’, in: Ekko C. van Ierland et al. (eds) Economic Growth and Valuation of the Environment. A Debate. Cheltenham Glos: Edgar Elgar.
- Hueting R. & L. Reijnders (2004), "Broad sustainability contra sustainability: the proper construction of sustainability indicators", Ecological Economics, Volume 50, Issues 3–4, 1 October 2004, Pages 249-260
