= Wim van den Goorbergh =

Dutch economist and banker (born 1948)

Willem Maria (Wim) van den Goorbergh (born 7 April 1948) is a Dutch economist and banker. He was Chief Executives Officer of the Executive board of the Rabobank until 2002.

== Biography ==
Born in Breda, Van den Goorbergh studied econometrics at the Tilburg University, where in 1971 he received his MSc and in 1978 his PhD under supervision of Dirk Bernard Joseph Schouten with a thesis entitled "Een macro-economische theorie van de werkgelegenheid : een conjunctuur- en structuuranalyse van het jaargangenmodel."

In 1971 Van den Goorbergh started as Assistant Professor to D.B.J. Schouten at the Tilburg University, Faculty Economics and the History of Economics. From 1980 to 2002 he was employed by the Rabobank. Starting in various areas of financial services from 1992 to 2002 he was member of the Executive board, where he served as vice-chairman and eventually as Chief Executive Officer. Since 2002 he has been a non-executive director at several companies and institutions, among them the Bank Nederlandse Gemeenten, the Radboud University Nijmegen, the Radboud University Nijmegen Medical Centre and the Nexus Institute.

== Publications ==
Van den Goorbergh has authored and co-authored several publications. A selection:

- 1978. Een macro-economische theorie van de werkgelegenheid : een conjunctuur- en structuuranalyse van het jaargangenmodel. Leiden : Stenfert Kroese
- 1979. Hoofdlijnen van de moderne groeitheorie. With Rob de Groof and Henk Peer. Leiden : Stenfert Kroese
- 1979. Over macht en wet in het economisch gebeuren : opstellen aangeboden aan Prof. Dr. D.B.J. Schouten bij zijn 25-jarig jubileum als hoogleraar in de Algemene Leer en Geschiedenis van de Economie aan de Katholieke Hogeschool. With Theo van de Klundert and Ad Kolnaar eds. Leiden : Stenfert Kroese
