= Jacobus Franciscus Haccoû =

Dutch economist

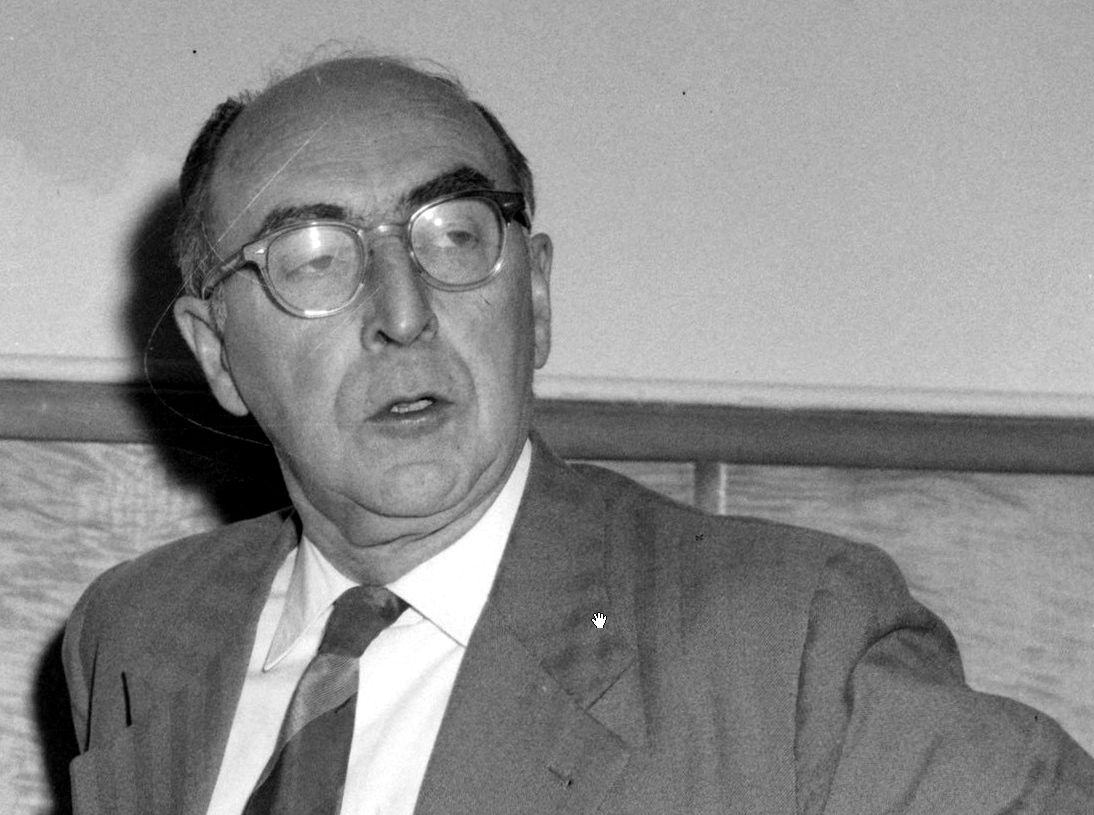
Prof. dr. J.F. Haccou, 1959.

Jacobus Franciscus (J.F.) Haccoû (27 December 1903 - 20 June 1972) was a Dutch economist, Professor of Business Economics at the University of Amsterdam and first director of SEO Economic Research, known for his work on the futures exchange of goods and the economic situation in Dutch East Indies.

== Biography ==
Born in Amsterdam, Haccoû received his MA in economics at the University of Amsterdam in 1926, and his Phd cum laude in economics in 1940 with the thesis "De termijnhandel in goederen" (The futures exchange in goods) under supervision of Théodore Limperg.

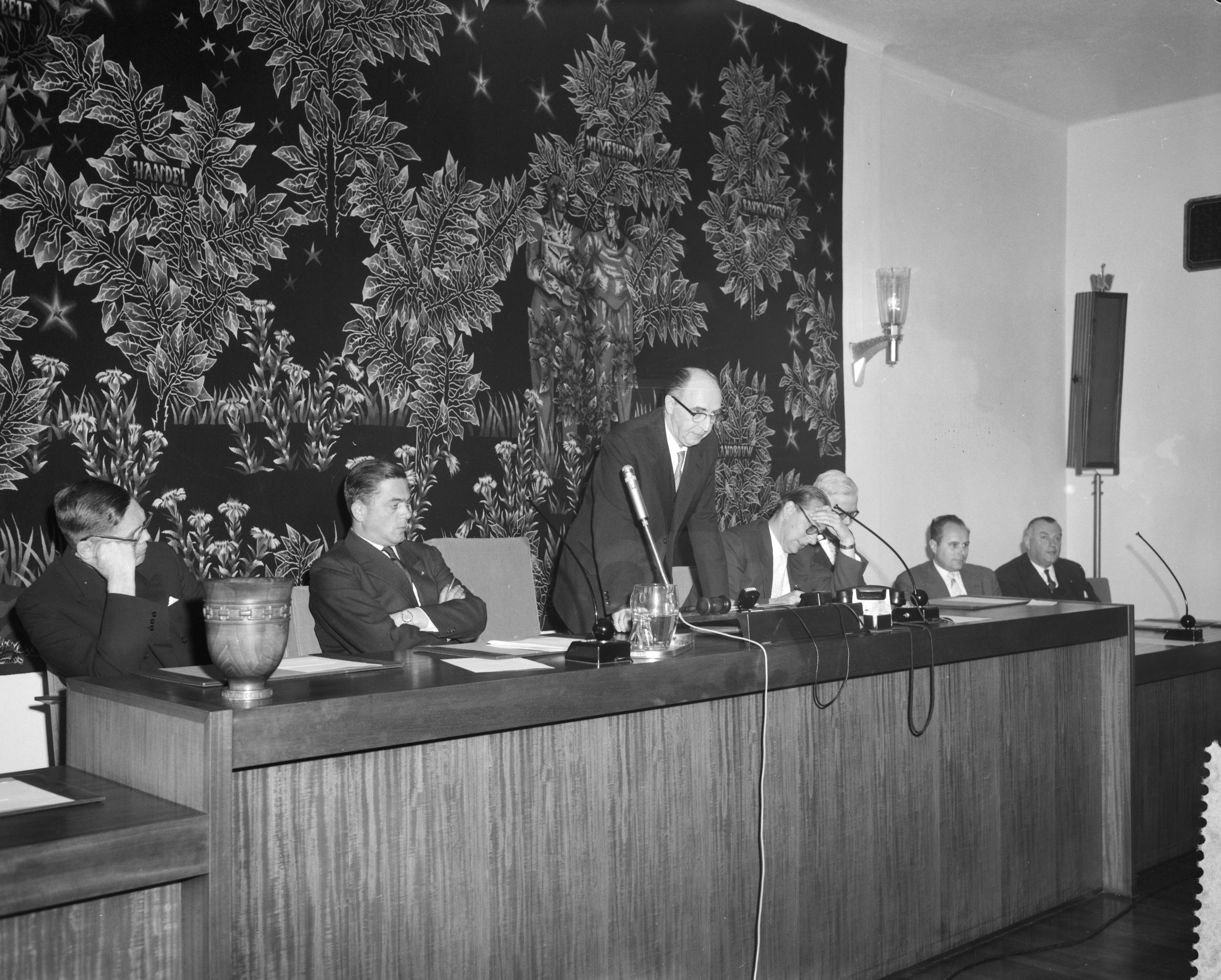
Official installation of the productivity center for fishing companies by Minister Victor Marijnen with speech of its president J.F. Haccou, 1959.

In 1950 he was appointed Professor of Business Economics, especially the doctrine of external organization at the University of Amsterdam. From 1950 to 1966 he was first director of Foundation for economic research of the University of Amsterdam, nowadays the SEO Economic Research. He was succeeded by Joop Klant.

In the late 1950s Haccoû was on the short list for the new Rector of the University of Amsterdam, but this position was granted to the former minister Joris in 't Veld. Haccou did get appointed president the National productivity center for fishing companies in 1959 (see image), one of his many other positions.

In 1972 Haccoû died in Amersfoort, Nederland.

== Work ==
Haccoû's primary concern was business economics, but his research interests and field of work was much broader. It ranged from the Amsterdam markets and wholesale, the Dutch international trading companies, and economic policy in the Dutch East Indies, to postwar emigration from the Netherlands. He even wrote a short book about stock trading on the leading U.S. stock exchanges and its historical development as SEO Economic Research project.

=== Economic policy in the Dutch East Indies ===
In 1935 Haccoû had presented a study of the economic policy in the Dutch East Indies, and in the early 1960s he published a work, entitled "The Economy of the Dutch East Indies: Its Struggle and Progress." A 1966 review in Acta Historiae Neerladica summarized, that Haccoû had dealt with:

... the question of the significance of the government's economic policy and the role of private enterprise, establishing the fact that two important production factors, management and capital, had to be introduced from outside. Both were increased considerably after the end of the 19th century, when the field for private enterprise was enlarged. Newly-established concerns, in taking advantage of the new opportunities thus offered, established the basis for the economic growth of the Indies.

And furthermore:

Conditions were particularly favourable for expansion in the agricultural sector. Western investment in sugar, tea and rubber increased rapidly up to 1929, and the management of many of the increasingly productive estates was transferred to the Netherlands. The capital thus invested from outside accelerated the development of the country and the population. It facilitated the opening-up of the country, increased employment opportunities and stimulated education and public health care, all of them points essential for development.

== Publications ==
Haccoû wrote several books and articles. A selection:

- 1947. De termijnhandel in goederen. Stenfert Kroese.
- 1948. De Indische exportproducten, hun beteekenis voor Indië en Nederland. Leiden : Stenfert Kroese
- 1952. De functie van de ondernemer in het huidige tijdsbestek. Met Johan Frederik ten Doesschate en A.C.J. Rottier. Leiden : Stenfert Kroese.
- 1957. Some fundamental problems of policy formation and organisation in the commercial field. Translated by D.A.S. Reid. Leiden : Stenfert Kroese
- 1957. Management of direct investments in less developed countries : report submitted to the international bank for reconstruction and development. By the Foundation for economic research of the University of Amsterdam. With D.A.S. Reid. Leiden : Stenfert Kroese
- 1958. Some quantitative aspects of stock trading on the leading U.S. stock exchanges : twenty-five years of development 1930-1954. By the Foundation for economic research of the University of Amsterdam. Leiden : Kroese
