= Coen Teulings =

Dutch economist (born 1958)

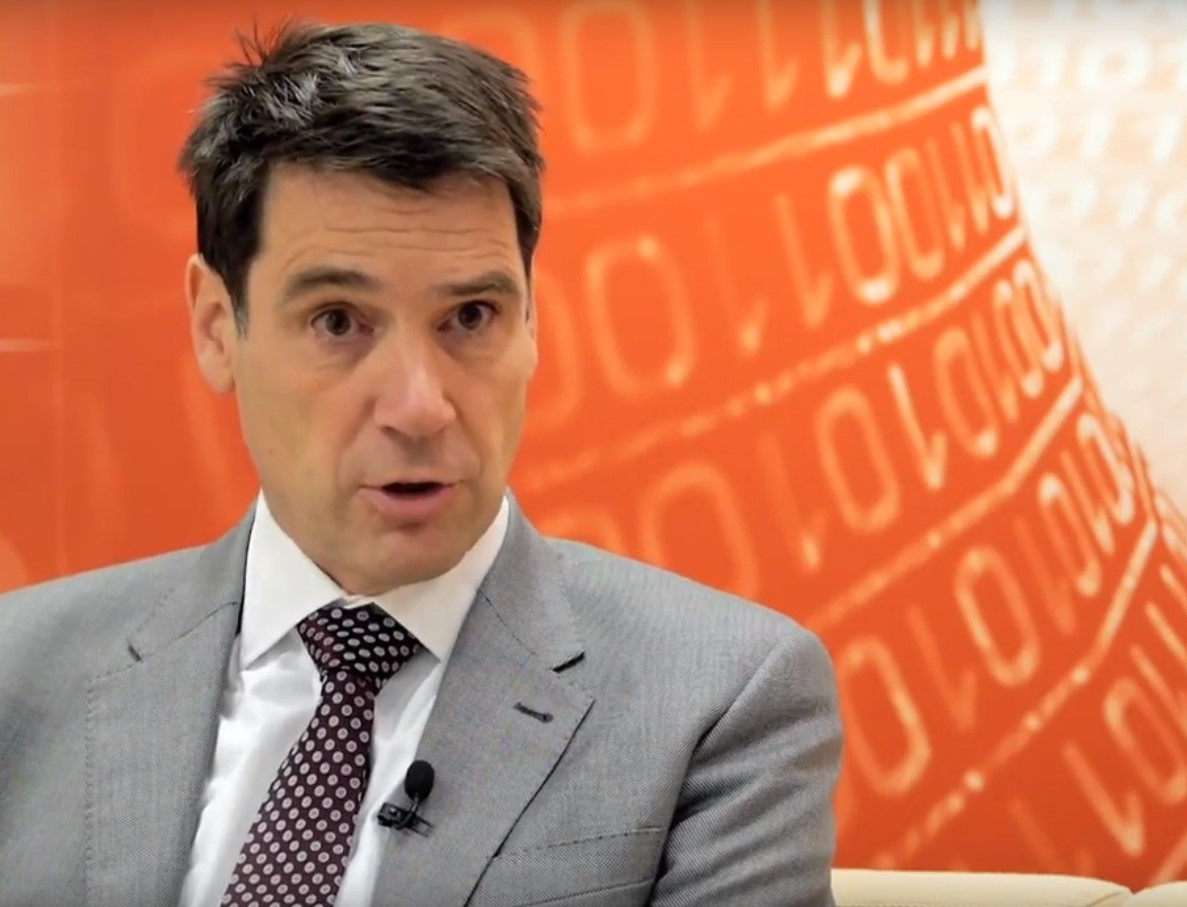
Coen Teulings (2014)

Coenraad Nicolaas (Coen) Teulings (born 13 December 1958) is a Dutch economist and distinguished professor at Utrecht University. He was formerly professor of Economics at the University of Amsterdam and the University of Cambridge and former Director of the Bureau for Economic Policy Analysis, as well as Chairman of Merifin Capital.

== Biography ==
Born in Rijswijk, Coen Teulings was the grandson of Frans Teulings, Deputy Prime Minister of the Netherlands 1951-52. He was a student at the University of Amsterdam, where he received his MA of Economics cum laude in 1985, and his PhD in 1990 with a thesis entitled "Conjunctuur en kwalificatie" (Cycle and skill).

In 1985 Teulings started as researcher for SEO Economic Research. From 1991 to 1995 he held a Research fellowship of the Royal Netherlands Academy of Arts and Sciences. From 1995 to 1998 he headed the department of income policy of the Dutch Ministry of Social Affairs. In 1997-98 he was appointed Professor of Labour Economics at the University of Amsterdam, and from 1998 to 2004 in the same function Professor of Labour Economics at the Erasmus University Rotterdam. From 1998 to 2004 he also directed the Tinbergen Institute as successor of Herman K. van Dijk. In 2004 back in Amsterdam he was appointed Professor of Economics at the University of Amsterdam, and Director of SEO Economic Research from 2004 to 2006. From 2006 to May 2013 he was Director of the Netherlands Bureau for Economic Policy Analysis.

In 2011, the Netherlands Bureau for Economic Policy Analysis (CPB) conducted a study on the effects of the euro on the Netherlands and published it, among other things, in the book "Europe in Crisis." One of the study's conclusions was that the euro may have brought a benefit equivalent to a week's salary, but that this is uncertain. In an interview with De Telegraaf in May 2014, Teulings, the former director of the CPB, stated that this conclusion should be taken with a grain of salt. His statement led to criticism from economists and politicians. For example, economist Lex Hoogduin found Teulings' comments damaging to the credibility of the CPB.

From 1 October 2013 he was appointed as the Montague Burton Professor of Industrial Relations and Labour Economics at Cambridge University. From 2018 onward, he is distinguished professor at Utrecht University.

In his dealings with colleagues, Teulings has a reputation for pushing the boundaries of decency. For example, in 2018, he treated Irene van Staveren rudely during the plenary session of the annual Economists' Day.

Teulings has been elected Fellow of the Tinbergen Institute, Fellow of the Institute for the Study of Labor, Fellow of CESifo in Munich, and Fellow of the Centre for Economic Policy Research in London.

Teulings was involved with Herstel-NL, an organization with a plan to reopen the economy instead of the lockdown imposed in February 2021 as a result of the coronavirus pandemic. Teulings defended the proposal, which drew widespread criticism, including on the television program Op1. The idea of transferring vulnerable people to "safe zones" was particularly unpopular. Teulings was accused of neglecting his role as an independent scientist. A few days after the plans were presented, Teulings announced that he would no longer be active for Herstel-NL.

== Publications ==
Teulings published numerous articles in the field of economics Books:

- 1998. Corporatism or competition?: labour contracts, institutions and wage structures in international comparison. With Joop Hartog. Cambridge University Press.

Articles, a selection:

- Teulings, Coen N. "The wage distribution in a model of the assignment of skills to jobs." Journal of Political Economy (1995): 280-315.
- Dolado, J., Kramarz, F., Machin, S., Manning, A., Margolis, D., Teulings, C., ... & Keen, M. (1996). The economic impact of minimum wages in Europe. Economic policy, 319-372.
- Teulings, Coen N., and Pieter A. Gautier. "The right man for the job." The Review of Economic Studies 71.2 (2004): 553-580.
- Teulings, Coen N., and Casper G. De Vries. "Generational accounting, solidarity and pension losses." De Economist 154.1 (2006): 63-83.

Academic offices
Preceded by William Brown	Montague Burton Professor of Industrial Relations, Cambridge University; 2013 -	Succeeded by incumbent
