= Bureau for Economic Policy Analysis =

Independent Dutch research institute tasked with measuring and forecasting the economy

- Centraal Planbureau
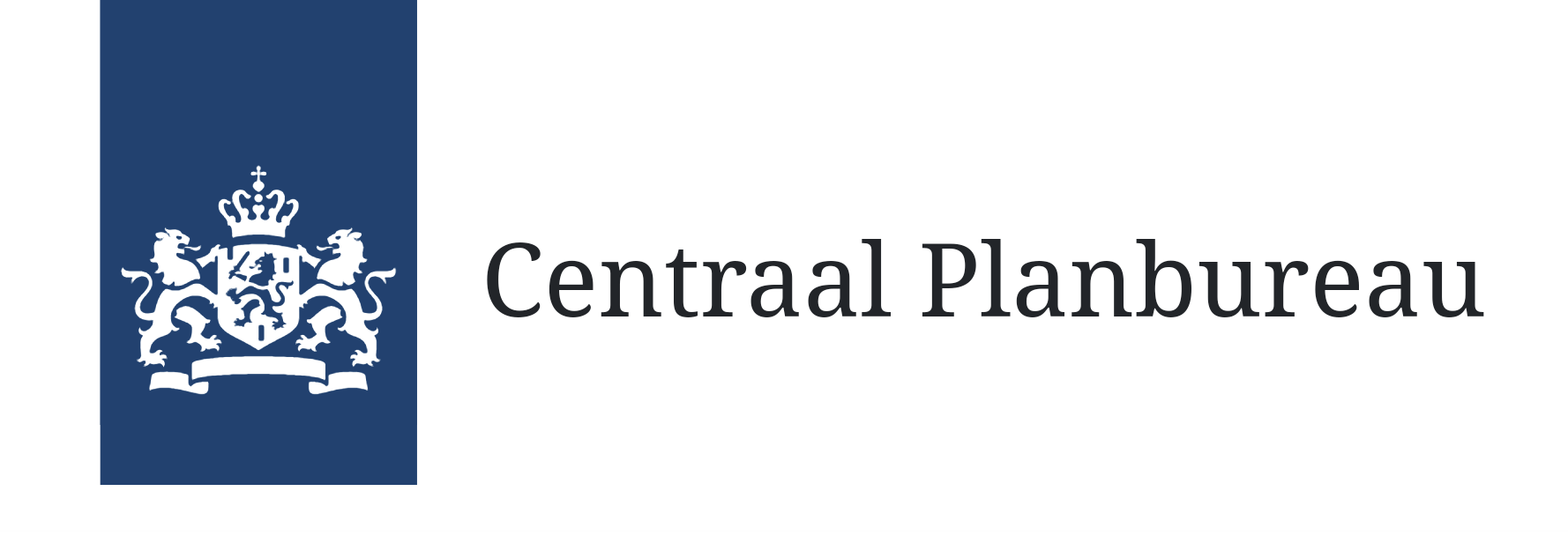

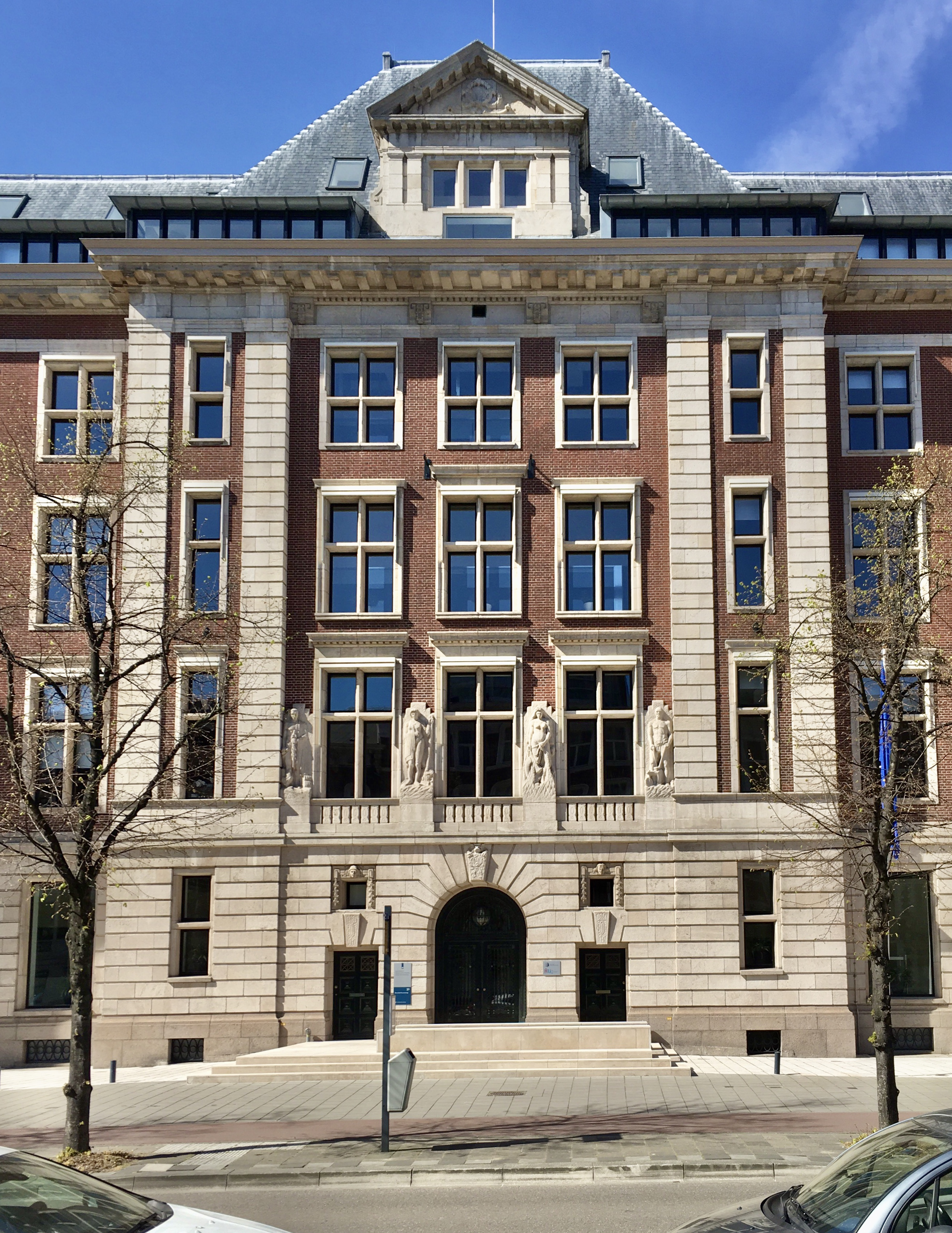
- Headquarters at Bezuidenhoutseweg 30 in The Hague

Agency overview
- Agency executive: Pieter Hasekamp, Director
- Website: cpb.nl

The Netherlands Bureau for Economic Policy Analysis (Dutch: Centraal Planbureau, CPB, literal translation: Central Planning Bureau) is a part of the Ministry of Economic Affairs of the Netherlands. Its goal is to deliver economic analyses and forecasts. The CPB is an independent government agency founded at 15 September 1945 by Nobel laureate Jan Tinbergen. On 21 April 1947, it obtained its legal basis. It is located in The Hague, on Bezuidenhoutseweg.

The CPB sets its own research agenda, but it is open to requests for policy research from the Dutch government, Parliaments and political parties and ministries of the Netherlands. It also provides reports and advice for European Union initiatives. The CPB is financed by the Ministry of Economic Affairs, but it operates independently. This means it does have a stable income but also does not have to follow the ministry. This combination is the foundation for the unique status of the CPB. The director of the CPB is one of the government appointed members (Dutch: kroonleden) in the Social and Economic Council.

== Economic forecasts ==
Twice a year, the CPB publishes a macroeconomic forecast called the "Central Economic Plan (CEP)" and the "Macroeconomic Explorations (MEV)".

The CEP is published in March. It includes the forecast for all the major variables and the current policies. At this point in time, new policies are decided or changed and they have a chance to look at the coming economic situation. For this purpose, it updates the forecasts of the previous MEV about the effects of the policies. A provisional version of the CEP is supplied to the cabinet in January or February, which is used by the minister of finance for the expenditure targets.

The MEV is published in September simultaneously with the publication of government budgets for the following year. It includes forecast for all the major variables and the effects of the new policies since last year. A preliminary, confidential, draft is sent to the government in June. Some adjustments of expenditures and revenues between the draft and the final version can be made.

== Analysis of election programmes ==
Before elections, the CPB is asked to analyze the election programmes of the major parties for the effects of proposed policies on the budget deficit, unemployment, inflation, income differentials, and so forth. This makes a clear guide for voters because of the following advantages:

- The same underlying economics base scenario for the next government's term is used to evaluate each election program. This means that differences in the outcomes between the parties cannot be due to diverging assumptions about economic developments.
- The political parties have to elaborate and explain their proposals in such a way that the CPB is able to analyze them. This means that the parties cannot (on the basis of unfounded optimism) exaggerate the benefits and/or understate the costs of their proposals.
- The policy proposals and their financial consequences are presented in a comparable way. This means that the parties' commitments in the financial and economic sphere can be compared to each other
- The CPB systematically investigates the consistency of the programs. In their initial proposals there may be some "miscalculations", but such issues are invariably resolved in the detailed discussions between the party in question and the CPB.
- The CPB only includes in its analysis measures which are expected to be technically and legally feasible. If the CPB does not have the in-house expertise to judge the feasibility or the legality of certain proposals, it obtains advice from other institutions.

It is also not uncommon to use the results of the CPB to defend attack or compare the different policies.

Parties voluntarily subject their programs to CPB analysis. However, after the elections of 1986, it became a custom that each major party asked the CPB to forecast the consequences of their election program. In general, the parties seem to worry more about being accused of not wanting to face the economic consequences of their proposals than showing negative results. In 2002, the party "List Pim Fortuyn" did not submit their elections platform, although it came in as second largest party.

The CPB analyzes government budget proposals on its own initiative. The analysis is considered a key document when determining how successful a government is with it policies. The results of this analysis is the basis for the income and expenditure for the Ministry of Economic Affairs. Through the independent status of the CPB, it is in practice impossible for the Dutch government to use their own models and interpretations of statistics. This forces the government, regardless of who is in power, to stay within the given boundaries and lowers the chance of budget surprises. It also increases the credibility of the ministry estimates.

== Models ==
The CPB uses a suite of economic models to analyze economic effects of policies and the economy at large. Their current main model is SAFFIER II, next to this there are several small models which can be attached to SAFFIER II.

The CPB models are regularly updated to reflect new theoretical insights and needs for outcomes.

== International coordination ==
The CPB is a member of the EU Independent Fiscal Institutions Network set up by the EU in September 2015. In addition to the CPB, the Netherlands is also represented by the Council of State.

== Controversy ==
In 2011, the CPB conducted a study on the effects of the Euro for the Netherlands. The results were, among others, published in the book 'Europa in crisis' (Europe in crisis). One of the conclusions of the research was that the Euro had brought about a week's pay in benefits to the Dutch population (i.e. about 2% income). In an interview in De Telegraaf in May 2014, former director Coen Teulings stated that the study performed under his supervision should be taken with a grain of salt, adding that the economic advantages "aren't very clear".

== Directors ==
The directors of the bureau have been:

- Jan Tinbergen (1945–1955)
- Fred Polak (1955–1957)
- Pieter de Wolff (1957–1966)
- Cees van den Beld (1966–1984)
- Peter de Ridder (1984–1989)
- Gerrit Zalm (1989–1994)
- Henk Don (1994–2006)
- Coen Teulings (2006–2013)
- Laura van Geest (2013–2020)
- Pieter Hasekamp (2020–present)

Beside the directors, other notable researchers of the institute have been:

- Lans Bovenberg
- Mars Cramer
- Wim Driehuis
- Per Schreiner
- Jan Sandee
- Henri Theil
- Johan Witteveen
