= De Economist =

- Discipline: Economics
- Language: English, Dutch

Publication details
- History: 1852 to present
- Publisher: Springer Science+Business Media for the Royal Netherlands Economic Association (Netherlands)
- Frequency: Quarterly

Standard abbreviations
- ISO 4: Economist (Leiden)

Indexing
- ISSN: 0013-063X (print); 1572-9982 (web)

Links
- Journal homepage

De Economist, Netherlands Economic Review is a quarterly peer-reviewed academic journal of economics published by Springer Science+Business Media on behalf of the Royal Netherlands Economic Association. It was established in 1852. It publishes theoretical and applied studies, preferably with a focus on European affairs. Originally published in Dutch, the majority of articles are nowadays in English.
