= Arnold Heertje =

Dutch economist and professor (1934–2020)

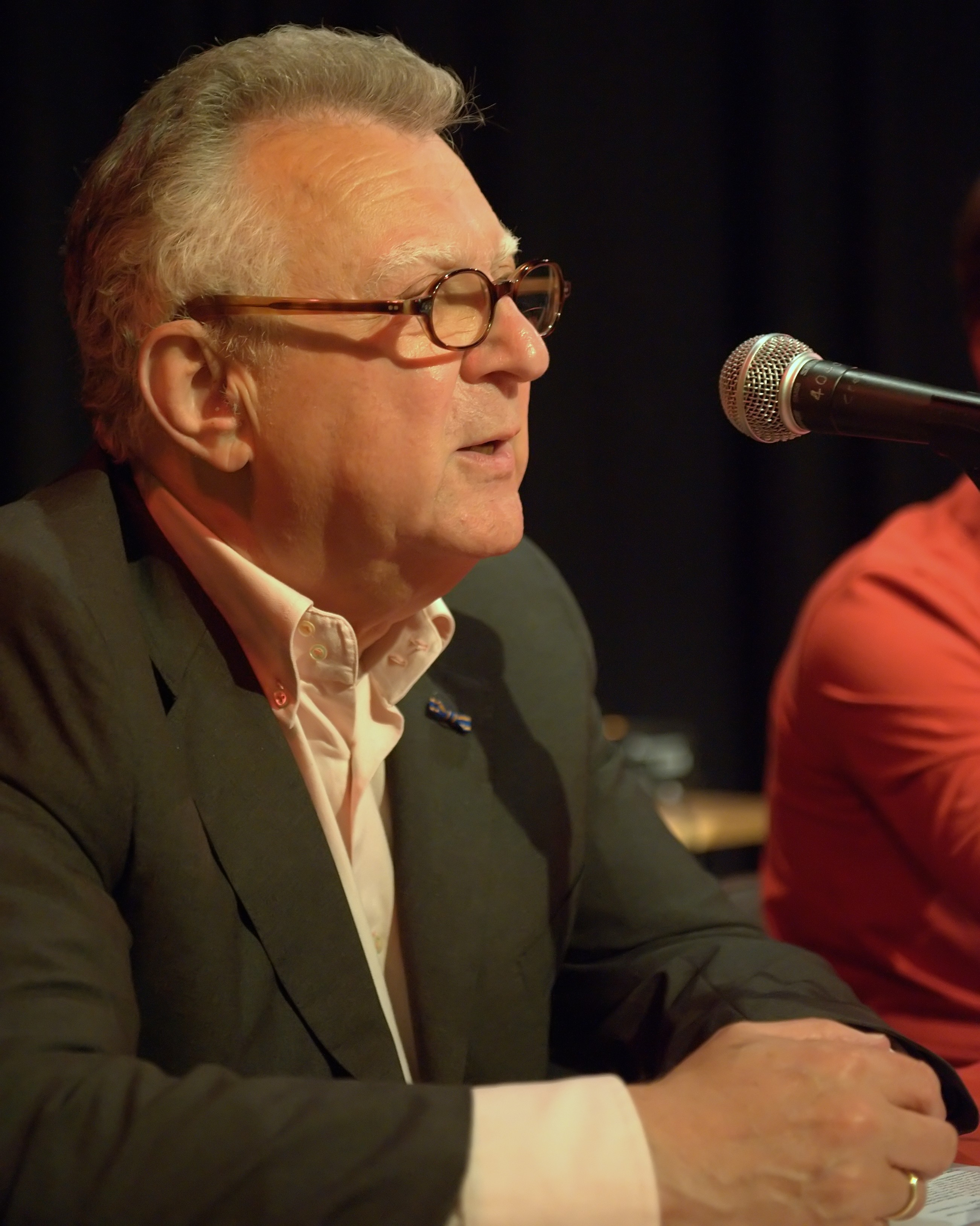
- Arnold Heertje (2009)
- Born: 19 February 1934; Breda, Netherlands
- Died: 4 April 2020 (aged 86); Naarden, Netherlands

Academic background
- Education: University of Amsterdam

Arnold Heertje (19 February 1934 – 4 April 2020) was a Dutch economist and professor at the University of Amsterdam, writer and columnist. He became more generally known for his opposition to the Betuweroute.

== Life and career ==
Heertje was born on 19 February 1934 in Breda, the son of Maurits Heertje and Estella Philips. Heertje grew up primarily in Arnhem. Due to their Jewish background, during the Second World War the whole family had to go in hiding after 12 November 1942. The eight-year-old Arnold ended up with a Reformed family in the Haarlemmermeer. Impressed by their faith, he planned to become a minister. Together with his parents he survived the war. After the war he wanted to join the Reformed church, but his mother forbade him. According to his mother, he would not be allowed to choose a church until he was eighteen. Heertje was not only impressed by the faith of people that had hidden him, but also by their poverty. He later remarked, that he "was impressed by the fact that all of the hiding places that existed were with families that were extremely poor. This made [him] raise the question of where that poverty actually came from. [He] wanted to know more about it and went to study economics..."

From 1951 to 1956 Heertje studied economics at the University of Amsterdam (UvA), and received his MA cum laude. At the same university he received his doctorate in 1960 for his thesis entitled "The price theory of the oligopoly". In 1958 he started teaching at the all Jewish Maimonides Lyceum in Amsterdam, and continued to do so until 1968. In the years 1963 and 1964 he taught at the Baarnsch Lyceum in Baarn.

In 1962 Heertje became known through his book De kern van de economie. It has sold over a few hundred thousand copies, and new editions are still printed.

From 1964 to 1999 he was Professor of Political Economy at the Law Faculty of the University of Amsterdam, and from 1997 to 2006 he was Professor in the History of Economic Science. He retired from the University of Amsterdam 3 May 2006, where he had taught for over forty years. In 1999 he was teaching at the Vossius Gymnasium in Amsterdam. Heertje became a member of the Royal Netherlands Academy of Arts and Sciences in 1997.

Arnold Heertje was married, has three sons, Eric (1960), Raoul (1963) and Patrick (1965–1991), and three grandchildren. Like his son, the comedian Raoul Heertje, he wrote columns for the newspaper Het Parool. Some of these columns are collected in his book De vierkante waarheid (The square truth).

Heertje died on 4 April 2020 in Naarden, aged 86.

== Work ==
=== Environmental economics ===
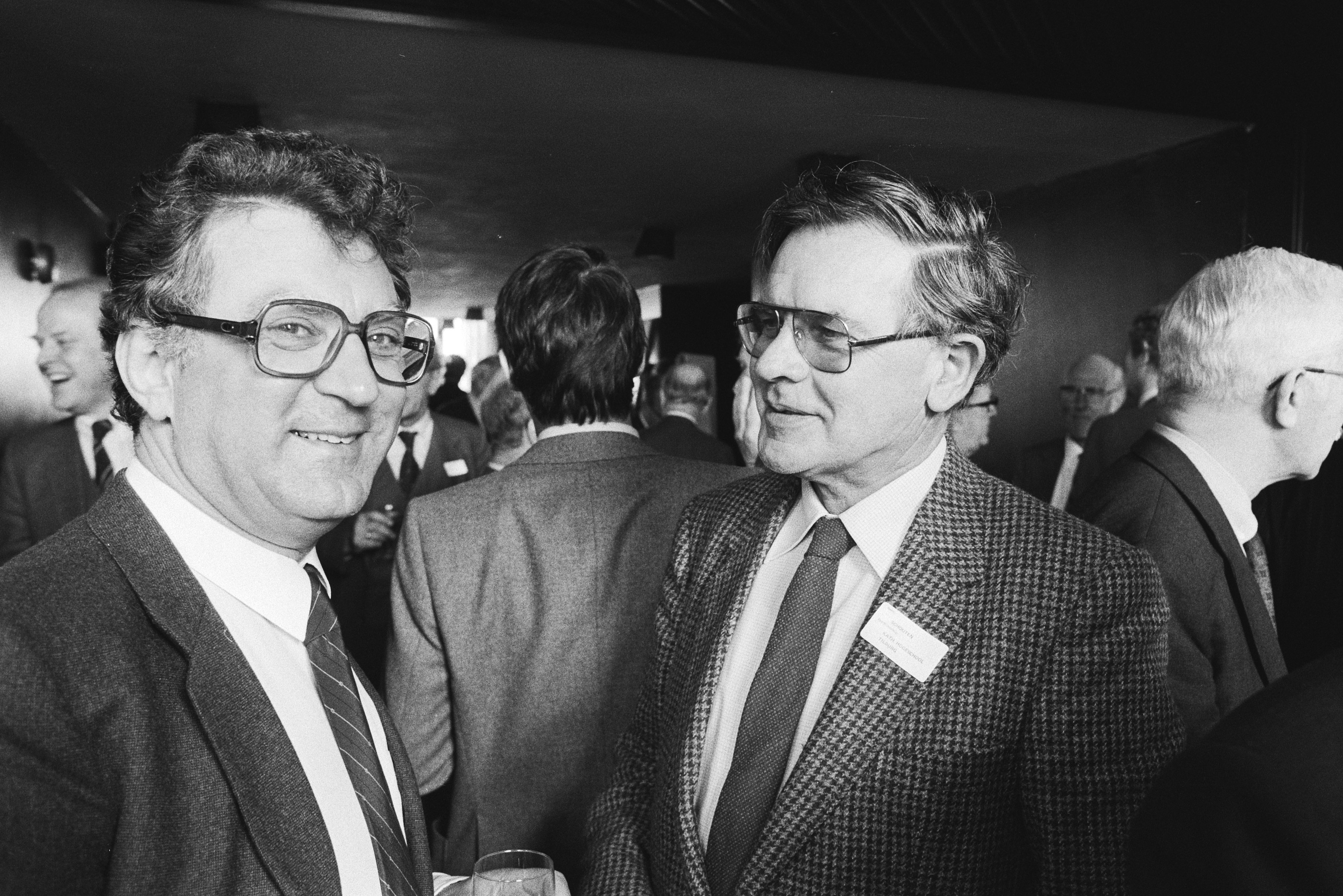
Arnold Heertje (left) with Professor D.B.J. Schouten in 1983

Heertje belonged to the group of economists, who defend the thesis that the field of the Economics is much more than just what can be expressed in money or what can be measured. The (almost) constant focus on consumerism and financial growth will make the emphasis on other human needs increasingly difficult. Eventually these other human needs will disappear for more and more people in their immediate environment.

Just as much of the field of Economics, according to Heertje, are those items difficult or impossible to express in monetary values such as nature, quality of life and sense of well-being. These kinds of values should be taken into consideration, when economic choices are made. Therefore, Heertje advocated custom sobriety.

Partly for this reason, Heertje was emphatically against the extension of the A15 van Bemmel facing Zevenaar. He argued, that the financing of each variant of that project is based on financial quicksand.

=== Politics ===
With the exception of a momentary switch to Democratic Socialists '70 (DS'70) in the 1970s, Heertje has always been a member of the Dutch Labour Party. He was considered a critical member, known for his blunt opinions concerning the board of the Labour Party.

Heertje once stated "The image of brawler is part of my biography, I rise when I feel treated unfairly." According to him administrators are often incompetent, on occasion referring in particular to Tineke Netelenbos and Annemarie Jorritsma.

=== Betuweroute and North/South line ===
Heertje was a distinct opponent of the construction of the Betuweroute. He was one of seven independent professors, who on own initiative turned against the construction, because it would only cost money. These Professors were particularly concerned about the highly manipulative approach of the Ministry of Transport. He and his colleagues were not convinced that the returns would be as promised by the instigators.

Heertje also turned against the construction of the new North/South line of the Amsterdam subway system, because he felt that the city did not have sufficient expertise. Both organizationally, technically and financially, he envisioned a debacle. The public sector would be fooled by the private sector.

=== Social involvement ===
In the 1970s Heertje eventually fought a futile battle to preserve the Amsterdam Volkstoneel, of which he was chairman.

In the mid-1990s he and Jo van der Hal founded the Stichting Behoud Weesper Synagoge (Weesper Synagogue Preservation Foundation). Thanks to donors they bought from the municipality the synagogue in Weesp, which hadn't been in use since 1942. He remained active in the Stichting Vrienden van de Weesper Synagoge (Friends of the Weesper Synagogue Foundation), which manages the building.

At the founding of the association "Beter Onderwijs Nederland" (Better Education Netherlands) in 2006 Heertje joined the committees of recommendation. This association aims to "stimulate the potential of pupils and students by supporting thorough professional and general education as well as possible".

=== Library ===
Heertje had an impressive scientific library of about twelve thousand books. He also collected antiquarian books on economics. He owned three thousand special books, including the first, sewn print of Das Kapital by Karl Marx, and An Essay on the Principle of Population by Thomas Malthus from 1798.

== Criticism ==
March 2011, the book "Het Arnold Heertje-effect" was published. It contains a strong critique of Heertje's style and argumentation in the public debate. It argued that the public debate is blocked by intellectuals like Heertje.

== Lost court case ==
On 14 May 2014 Heertje lost a court case brought by the Youth Care Agency. Heertje had written an article on the websites of Yahoo! News and Volkskrant about a case involving a boy who was under the supervision of the juvenile justice system. According to Heertje, this 7-year-old boy from Amsterdam was "kidnapped" from school by the Youth Care Agency and brought to a secret place. He mentioned the names of the employees involved. According to the court in Amsterdam there was no need to mention the names of those individuals, and the court also found that Heertje's comparisons between the actions of the Youth Care Agency and events in World War II were unnecessarily hurtful and offensive. Heertje's articles therefore were removed from the Internet. The lawyer for the Youth Care Agency stated that Heertje had not done proper research into the case and that his articles amounted to public pillorying. "There was no kidnapping and the youth was taken away that day at school in consultation with the father who had the authority at that time." Heertje was unrepentant and did not express remorse.

== Selective publications ==
Books, a selection:

- Heertje, Arnold, and Z. St-Gallay. Economics and technical change. London: Weidenfeld and Nicolson, 1977.
- Arnold Heertje (ed.) Schumpeter's Vision. New York: Praeger, 1981.
- Stiglitz, Joseph E & Arnold Heertje (ed.), The economic role of the state. (1989).
- Heertje, Arnold, and Mark Perlman. (eds.) Evolving technology and market structure: studies in Schumpeterian economics. University of Michigan Press, 1990.
- Polak, Jacob, and Arnold Heertje. European transport economics. Blackwell, 1993.
- Walker, Donald A., Arnold Heertje, and Hans Van Den Doel. Welfare economics and the theory of economic policy. Edward Elgar, 1995.
- Heertje, Arnold, and Heinz-Dieter Wenzel. Grundlagen der Volkswirtschaftslehre. Springer-Verlag, 2013.
