= Wim Driehuis =

Dutch economist

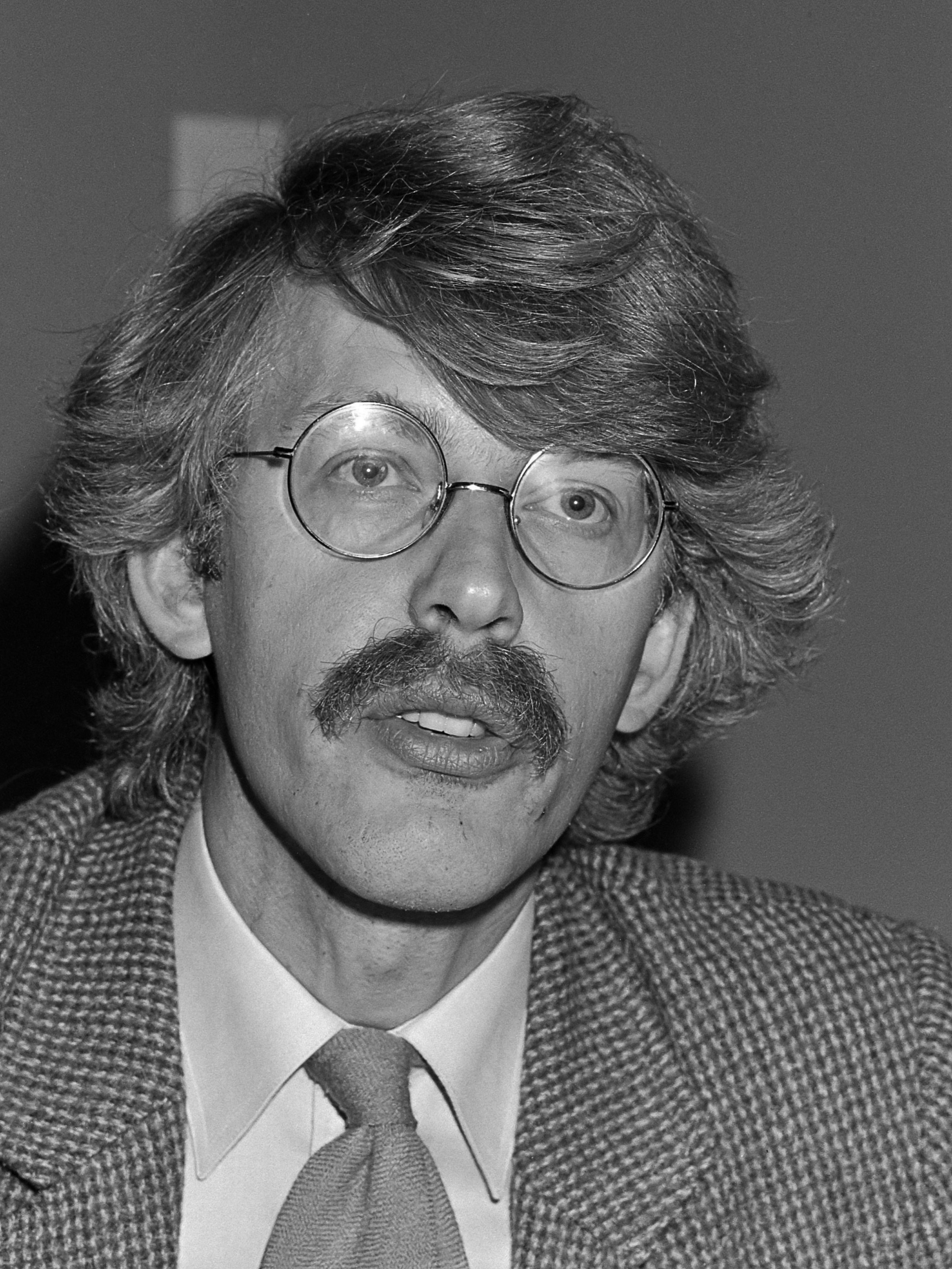
Wim Driehuis (1981)

Wim Driehuis (born 22 June 1943) is a Dutch economist, Emeritus Professor Economics and Business at the University of Amsterdam.

== Biography ==
Born in Utrecht, Driehuis received his BA in Economics in 1963 and his MA in Economics in 1967, both at the University of Amsterdam. In 1972 he received his PhD cum laude from the Erasmus University Rotterdam.

== Career ==
Driehuis started his career as assistant for KPMG in 1960. In 1963-64 he was part-time student-researcher for SEO Economic Research and in 1965-66 he was part-time researcher for the Rabobank. In 1967 he started for CPB Netherlands Bureau for Economic Policy Analysis as economist, became Head of the Division of Labour Market and Social Policy, and later as Head of the Business Cycle Division. In 1973 Driehuis was appointed Professor of Economics at the University of Amsterdam. In 1975 he became Professor of Macroeconomics till 1991. He then became part-time Professor of Marketing and Marketing Research till 2002. From 1990 to 2007 Driehuis was CEO of EMIS N.V.(European Marketing Information Services). From 2000 to 2008 he was Director for PricewaterhouseCoopers. In 2002 he was appointed part-time Professor of Applied Economics, while affiliated to the Amsterdam Center for Law & Economics (ACLE) at the University of Amsterdam.

== Other positions ==
Driehuis has held numerous other part-time academic and executive positions, among which the most important are: Member (Chairman) of the SER Committee of Economic Experts, Managing Director of SEO Economic Research, Consultant to IMF, World Bank, OECD and EU, Chairman of Dutch Society for Advertising, Director of PwC European Network and Director of Economics Network for Competition and Regulation.

== Award ==
In 1975 Driehuis was awarded the Winkler Prins Prize for the best PhD in Economics.

== Publications ==
Driehuis has authored and co-authored many books and articles in the field of macro-economics, econometric model building, labour market, market research and law and economics. His most important publications involve:

- (1969). "Primary Commodity Prices: Analysis and Forecasting". Ed. Rotterdam University Press.
- (1969). "Experiments in Explaining and Forecasting the Invisible Trade of the Netherlands Bulletin Oxford Institute of Economics and Statistics", (pp. 335–352).
- (1970). "An Econometric Analysis of Liner Freight Rates", Review of Word Economics (pp. ).
- (1972). "Fluctuations and Growth in a Near Full Employment Economy: a Quarterly Econometric Analysis of the Netherlands", Rotterdam University Press.
- (1975). "Inflation, Wage bargaining, Wage Policy and Production Structure: Theory and empirical results for the Netherlands", De Economist, (pp. 638–679).
- (1976). "A Sectoral Wage-Price Model for the Netherlands’ Economy", (with P.de Wolff) in H. Frisch, Inflation in Small Countries, (pp 283–339).
- (1978). "Labour Market Imbalances and Structural Unemployment", Kyklos, (pp. 638–661).
- (1979). "An Analysis of the Impact of Demand and Cost factors on Employment", De Economist, (pp. 255–285).
- (1980). "A Critical View on the Preparation of Economic Policy" (in Dutch), with A. van der Zwan. Stenfert Kroese.
- (1981). "Employment and Technical Progress in Open Economies", in Economies of the Labour Market, (pp. 189–220).
- (1983). "A Sectoral Model for the Dutch Economy" (with E.C. van Ierland and P.J. van den Noord. University of Lodz.
- (1984). "Economics, Energy and Environment" (in Dutch), (with E.C. van Ierland en P.J. van den Noord), SEO-research.
- (1985). "Macroeconomic Investment and Employment Functions" in R. v.d. Ploeg (ed.) Mathematical Methods in Economics.
- (1986). "Unemployment in the Netherlands 1960-1983", Economica (pp. 297–312).
- (1987). "Introduction to Economics" (in Dutch), Vol. 1 and vol. 2., Stenfert Kroese.
- (1988). "Challenges for Macroeconomic Modelling", (ed. with M.M.G. Fase and H. den Hartog) North-Holland Publishing.
- (1988). "A Disequilibrium Model for the Dutch economy", in C. Bean(ed.), Europe's Unemployment Problem (pp. 329–365).
- (1988). "The Effects of investment Subsidies on Employment" (with P.J. van den Noord, Economic Modelling,(pp. 32–40).
