= Ivo Molenaar =

Dutch psychometrician and statistician (1935–2018)

- Born: September 12, 1935; The Hague, Netherlands
- Died: 26 February 2018 (aged 82)
- Other name: Wouter Molenaar

Academic background
- Education: University of Amsterdam
- Thesis: Approximations to the Poisson, Binomial and Hypergeometric Distribution Functions (1970)
- Doctoral advisor: Jan Hemelrijk; Willem van Zwet

Academic work
- Institutions: Centrum Wiskunde & Informatica; University of Groningen
- Doctoral students: Klaas Sijtsma

Ivo Wouter Molenaar (September 12, 1935 – February 26, 2018), also known as Wouter Molenaar, was a Dutch mathematical statistician and psychometrician who served as Professor of Statistical Analysis and Measurement Theory for the Social Sciences at the University of Groningen. He is known for his contributions to item response theory, Bayesian statistics, and the development of psychometric methods for the social sciences.

== Education and career ==
Molenaar was born in the Hague. He studied mathematics at the University of Amsterdam, initially focusing on abstract mathematics before shifting his emphasis to mathematical statistics. His primary academic influence was Jan Hemelrijk, professor of statistics at Amsterdam, who introduced him to applied statistics. Molenaar completed his doctoral dissertation under the joint supervision of Jan Hemelrijk and Willem van Zwet. From 1962 to 1970, Molenaar worked at the Mathematisch Centrum (later renamed the Centrum Wiskunde & Informatica) in Amsterdam, where he engaged in statistical consulting, taught postgraduate courses, and conducted research. During this period he attended European statistics conferences, where he made connections with international scholars including Ganapati Patil of Pennsylvania State University, who invited him for a visiting year in the United States.

While still at Penn State, Molenaar was recruited by the University of Groningen to fill a newly created joint chair in statistics for psychology, sociology, and educational science. At Groningen, Molenaar became a central figure in Dutch quantitative social science. He began collaborating with Robert Mokken, who held a similar chair at the University of Amsterdam and had developed a nonparametric measurement model for measuring attitudes and abilities. He also worked closely with Adriaan de Groot, considered the first methodologist of the Netherlands, from whom he learned about the pitfalls of social science research, including the problem of capitalization on chance. Molenaar also helped found and support IOPS (Interuniversity Graduate School of Psychometrics and Sociometrics), which began in 1987 and created a community for the small but active Dutch psychometric research network.

== Honors and awards ==
Molenaar was the president of the Netherlands Society for Statistics and Operations Research from 1991 to 1993, when he was also an editor of the journal Statistica Neerlandica. Molenaar was elected President of the Psychometric Society in 1997. His presidential address, "Data, Model, Conclusion, Doing It All Again", is considered one of his influential works. In the address, Molenaar argued for a closer relationship between formal statistical modeling and substantive research questions, advocating for what he termed voordenken ("prethinking"), careful consideration of research questions before data collection, as opposed to nadenken ("postthinking"), or reflection only after data have been gathered.

== Books ==
- Molenaar, W. (1970). Approximations to the Poisson, Binomial and Hypergeometric Distribution Functions. Mathematisch Centrum. ISBN 978-90-6196-053-9.
- Fischer, Gerhard H.; Molenaar, Ivo W., eds. (1995). Rasch Models. New York, NY: Springer New York. doi:10.1007/978-1-4612-4230-7. ISBN 978-1-4612-8704-9.
- Sijtsma, K.; Molenaar, Ivo W. (2002). Introduction to nonparametric item response theory. Measurement methods for the social sciences series. Thousand Oaks, Calif: SAGE Publications. ISBN 978-0-7619-0812-8.
