= Vrije Groepen Amsterdam =

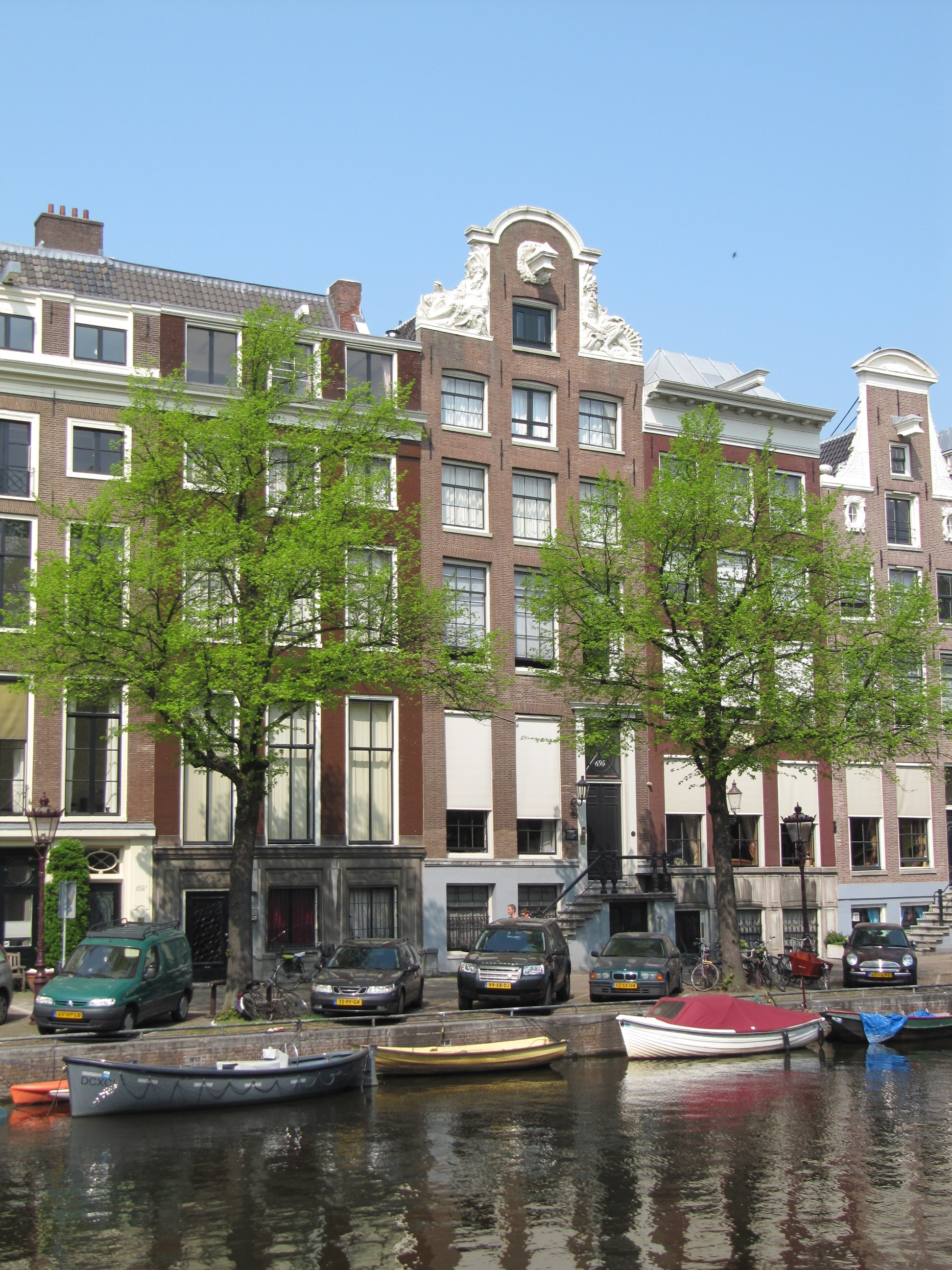
Keizersgracht 695 (centre of photo), where the organisation was founded in 1943

The Vrije Groepen Amsterdam (VGA, "Free Groups of Amsterdam") was a federation of Dutch resistance groups in Amsterdam during the final years of World War II. The VGA was founded in late 1943 to coordinate the activities of Amsterdam's resistance groups. The groups counted some 350 members, about a fifth of whom had a Jewish or part-Jewish background. The VGA focused primarily on hiding Jews from the Nazis and caring for Jews in hiding. Their activities included distributing falsified identification documents, as well as ration cards and financial support, to Jews and others in hiding (so-called onderduikers) and to members of the resistance movement.

The 38 groups united under the VGA umbrella included the PP group led by Bob van Amerongen and Jan Hemelrijk, which consisted mainly of Jewish and part-Jewish members. The groep-Gerretsen and groep-Brandsma resistance groups were also part of the VGA.

The name vrije groepen ("free groups") indicated that the resistance groups did not want to join the national resistance organisation Landelijke Organisatie voor Hulp aan Onderduikers (LO) but preferred to remain independent. The choice to remain independent was often related to the fact that the LO reported all families hiding Jews and others from the Nazis to the Nationaal Steun Fonds (NSF), an organisation which coordinated the financial support of the Dutch resistance activities. This reporting was considered too risky by the vrije groepen, who therefore chose not to be affiliated with the LO. Another reason why these groups preferred to remain independent of the national organisations was that many of the groups represented specific minorities such as Jews or socialists.

== History ==
In late 1943, the various organisations caring for Jews and others in hiding in Amsterdam established regular contact. A number of leaders of these groups met at Keizersgracht 695 to found the VGA. A similar federation was established in The Hague, the Vrije Groepen Den Haag.

"For us, it was the most dangerous meeting of the war", Jan Hemelrijk said of the gathering on Keizersgracht. "There were about thirty people, all representing various groups. I went there shaking in my boots. Fortunately we were not betrayed, or the Germans would have been able to arrest the entire non-affiliated resistance movement in Amsterdam in one fell blow."

The VGA had a special branch aimed at identifying traitors and helping members who had been arrested, in some cases even attempting to break them free. The intelligence work included making contact with a broad network of jailers, attorneys, physicians, priests and even members of the German Sicherheitsdienst (SD) intelligence agency.

== Remembrance ==
In April 2013, a book by Loes Gompes documenting the history of the PP group, one of the organisations in the VGA, was published under the title Fatsoenlijk land: Porgel en Porulan in het verzet. The book was accompanied by a documentary film of the same title, which was shown in the Joods Historisch Museum (Jewish Historical Museum) in Amsterdam in January 2014 and broadcast in April of that year on national television channel Nederland 2.

In May 2014, the film was shown in cinema Tuschinski in Amsterdam, followed by interviews with children of PP group members. Following the showing, a ceremony was held to unveil a plaque on the building at Keizersgracht 695 commemorating the founding of the VGA there.

The archive of the VGA is maintained by the NIOD Institute for War, Holocaust and Genocide Studies.

== See also ==
- Group 2000
- Anne Frank
- Netherlands in World War II
