= Paul McNicholas =

Paul McNicholas may refer to:

- Paul McNicholas (rugby league)
- Paul McNicholas (statistician)
