= Richard D. Gill =

British mathematician

Richard David Gill
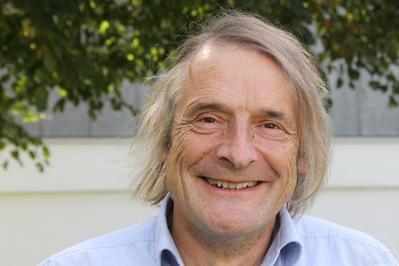
- Gill in 2014
- Born: 11 September 1951 (age 74)
- Education: Cambridge University (BA); VU Amsterdam (PhD)
- Scientific career
- Workplaces: CWI; VU Amsterdam; Utrecht University; Leiden University
- Doctoral students: Sara van de Geer; Linda van der Gaag (co-advised by Jan Bergstra); Mark van der Laan (co-advised by Peter Bickel)

Richard David Gill (born 11 September 1951) is a British-Dutch mathematician and professor emeritus at Leiden University. He has held academic positions in the Netherlands. As a probability theorist and statistician, Gill has researched counting processes. He is also known for his consulting and advocacy on behalf of alleged victims of statistical misrepresentation, including the reversal of the murder conviction of a Dutch nurse who had been jailed for six years.

== Education ==
Gill was born in 1951 in Redhill, Surrey, England. He went to Gonville and Caius College, Cambridge in 1970 and earned a BA degree (1st class) in mathematics from the University of Cambridge in 1973, followed by a Diploma of Statistics (with distinction) in 1974.

He subsequently moved to the Netherlands, where he married his Dutch wife, and in 1974 began his doctoral research at the Amsterdam Mathematics Centre, later receiving his PhD in mathematics from the Vrije Universiteit Amsterdam (VU Amsterdam) in 1979. His thesis, supervised by Jacobus (Kobus) Oosterhoff and Carel Scheffer, was titled Censoring and Stochastic Integrals.

Gill has said that he was "not much of an activist" as a student, but now feels guilty about not speaking up more at the time about perceived injustices, saying that this is partly because of an incident when working as a statistician in the 1970s when he helped on an experiment that severed the front legs of rats to investigate whether it would lead to the reshaping of their skulls. Gill said that this incident has stayed with him, as "what upset me most is that I didn’t have the strength of character to refuse to do that job".

== Career ==
From 1974 to 1983, Gill worked as a research associate at the Mathematical Statistics department of the Mathematical Centre (later renamed Centrum Wiskunde & Informatica, or CWI) in Amsterdam. Between 1979 and 1982, he was also part-time research associate at Interfaculty for Actuarial Science and Econometrics of the VU Amsterdam. After receiving his doctorate, he continued to collaborate with Danish and Norwegian statisticians for ten years, co-authoring Statistical models based on counting processes, by Andersen, Borgan, Gill, and Keiding.

Gill became head of the Mathematical Statistics Department at the CWI in 1983. From 1986 to 1990, he also served as a special professor (Dutch: "bijzonder hoogleraar") at Leiden University. In 1988, Gill moved to the Department of Mathematics of Utrecht University, where he became a full professor in mathematical stochastics, a position he held till 2006.

In 2006, Gill moved to the Department of Mathematics at Leiden University, where he was appointed to the position of Professor of mathematical statistics. He retired from Leiden in 2017. During his career Gill has supervised 24 doctoral students, including Sara van de Geer and Mark van der Laan (co-advised by Peter Bickel).

Gill became a citizen of the Netherlands in 1996.

== Advocacy ==
Gill has lobbied for retrials for nurses whose criminal convictions were based in part on statistical evidence, including Lucia de Berk and Benjamin Geen. Gill also said in a 2021 lecture that he suspects Beverley Allitt is innocent, and in a 2020 paper said the case "deserves fresh study". Gill states that his original involvement in campaigning for nurses stemmed from his wife encouraging him to get involved in the De Berk case, recounting her saying "They’re using statistics; you should get involved, do something useful".

De Berk was sentenced in the Netherlands to life imprisonment in 2003, after a legal psychologist gave testimony that there was great likelihood that De Berk committed a string of murders. Gill and other professional statisticians showed this statistical testimony to be fallacious. Continued scrutiny further invalidated the testimony by showing that the data had been collected to support the conviction of De Berk. After a campaign in which Gill helped, a retrial was ordered and De Berk was found not guilty; she received a public apology from the Dutch government, which also began negotiating financial compensation.

Gill's challenge of statistical evidence played a role in securing Daniela Poggiali's acquittal on murder charges in Italy in 2021.

Benjamin Geen's applications for a retrial have been rejected and in 2013 and 2015 Gill and other statisticians asked the Criminal Cases Review Commission (CCRC) to look into his case. The appeals were unsuccessful.

In 2022 Gill contributed to a peer reviewed report from the Royal Statistical Society on statistical issues in investigation of suspected medical misconduct.

Since the conviction a British neonatal nurse, Lucy Letby, on multiple charges of murder and attempted murder in August 2023, Gill has publicly expressed doubt over her guilt.

== Honours ==
Gill was elected a Member of the International Statistical Institute in 1984, and a Fellow of the international Institute of Mathematical Statistics in 1989. He was appointed a Member of the Royal Netherlands Academy of Arts and Sciences in 1999. From 2007 to 2011, he served as President of the Netherlands Society for Statistics and Operations Research. Gill was selected as the 2010–2011 Distinguished Lorentz Fellow by the Netherlands Institute for Advanced Study in Humanities and Social Sciences.

== Selected publications ==
- Andersen, Per K.; Borgan, Ornulf; Gill, Richard D.; Keiding, Niels (2012). Statistical Models Based on Counting Processes. Springer Science & Business Media. ISBN 978-1-4612-4348-9.
- Baddeley, Adrian J.; Gill, Richard D. (1997). "Kaplan-Meier estimators of distance distributions for spatial point processes". The Annals of Statistics. 25: 263–292. doi:10.1214/aos/1034276629.
