= Patrick Groenen =

Dutch economist (born 1964)

Patrick John Fitzgerald (Patrick) Groenen (born 1964) is a Dutch economist and Professor of Statistics at the Erasmus School of Economics (ESE) of the Erasmus University Rotterdam, known for his work in the fields of exploratory factor analysis, multidimensional scaling and numerical algorithms in these fields.

== Biography ==
Groenen received his MA in 1988 at the Leiden University, where in 1993 he received his Phd under supervision of Willem J. Heiser with the thesis, entitled "The majorization approach to multidimensional scaling: some problems and extensions"

After graduation Groenen started his academic career as Assistant Professor at the Leiden University. In 2002 he was appointed Professor in Statistics at the School of Economics, Erasmus University. Since 2014 he is also Director of the Econometric Institute as successor of Albert Wagelmans.

Groenen is Associate Editor of several journals: Psychometrika since 1997, the Statistica Neerlandica since 2002, and the journal Advances in Data Analysis and Classification since 2009.

== Selected publications ==
Groenen has authored and co-authored numerous publications. Books:

- Groenen, Patrick JF. The majorization approach to multidimensional scaling: some problems and extensions. Leiden: DSWO Press, Leiden University, 1993.
- Borg, Ingwer, and Patrick JF Groenen. Modern multidimensional scaling: Theory and applications. Springer, 2005.

Articles, a selection:

- Groenen, Patrick JF, Rudolf Mathar, and Willem J. Heiser. "The majorization approach to multidimensional scaling for Minkowski distances." Journal of Classification 12.1 (1995): 3-19.
- Groenen, Patrick JF, and Willem J. Heiser. "The tunneling method for global optimization in multidimensional scaling." Psychometrika 61.3 (1996): 529-550.
- Groenen, Patrick JF, and Krzysztof Jajuga. "Fuzzy clustering with squared Minkowski distances." Fuzzy Sets and Systems 120.2 (2001): 227-237.
- Linting, M., Meulman, J. J., Groenen, P. J., & van der Koojj, A. J. (2007). Nonlinear principal components analysis: introduction and application. Psychological methods, 12(3), 336.
