= Jan de Leeuw =

Dutch statistician and psychometrician (born 1945)

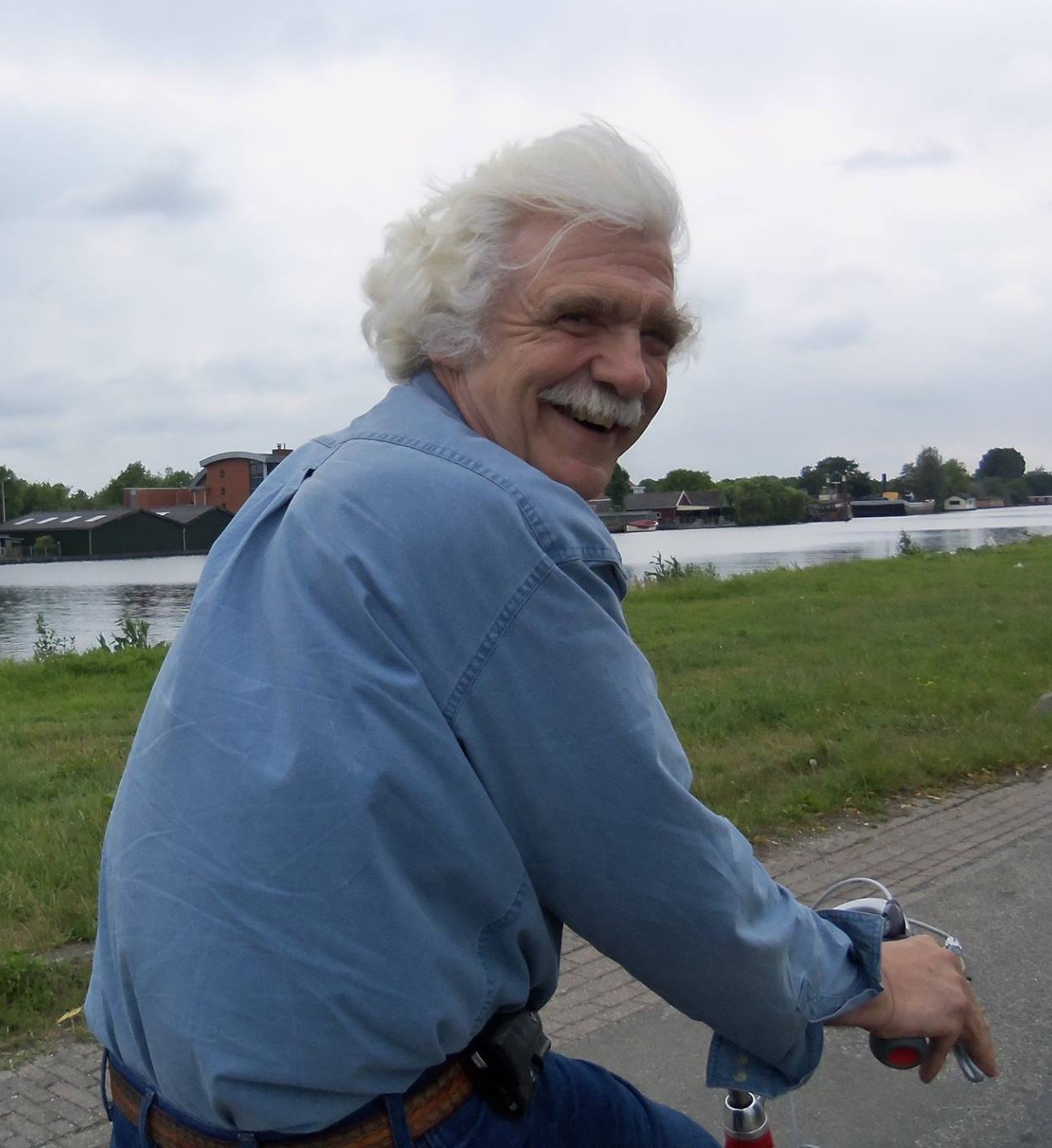
- Born: December 19, 1945 (age 79); Voorburg, The Netherlands
- Education: Leiden University
- Scientific career
- Institutions: Leiden University; Bell Labs; University of California, Los Angeles
- Thesis: Canonical Analysis of Categorical Data (1973)
- Doctoral advisor: John P. van de Geer
- Doctoral students: Willem Heiser; Jacqueline Meulman; Catrien Bijleveld; Mine Çetinkaya-Rundel
- Website: jansweb.netlify.app

Jan de Leeuw (born December 19, 1945) is a Dutch statistician and psychometrician. He is distinguished professor emeritus of statistics and founding chair of the Department of Statistics, University of California, Los Angeles. In addition, he is the founding editor and former editor-in-chief of the Journal of Statistical Software, as well as the former editor-in-chief of the Journal of Multivariate Analysis and the Journal of Educational and Behavioral Statistics.

== Education ==
Born in Voorburg, De Leeuw attended the Hogere Burgerschool in Voorburg and Alphen aan den Rijn from 1957 to 1963. He studied at Leiden University, where he received his propedeutic examination psychology summa cum laude in 1964; his candidate examination psychology summa cum laude in 1967; and his doctoral examination psychology summa cum laude in 1969. In 1973 he received his PhD cum laude with a thesis entitled "Canonical Analysis of Categorical Data" advised by John P. van de Geer. The thesis described an alternative organization of multivariate data analysis techniques, which formed the basis for the Gifi group in Leiden and the Gifi system more broadly.

== Career and research ==
De Leeuw started his academic career as assistant professor in the Department of Data Theory in Leiden University in 1969. He was member of technical staff, Bell Labs, Murray Hill, New Jersey, in 1973–1974. Back in The Netherlands he was professor of data theory, Leiden University, from 1977 to 1987. In 1987 he moved to University of California, Los Angeles, where he became professor of psychology and mathematics, and director of the interdepartmental program in social statistics until 1998. From 1993 to 1998 he was also acting director of the interdivisional program in statistics. In 1998 to 2014 he became founding chair of the Department of Statistics at University of California, Los Angeles, where he was professor and distinguished professor from 1998 until 2014. After his retirement in July 2014 UCLA Statistics started a yearly De Leeuw Seminar series.

De Leeuw started as associate editor for Psychometrika (1982–1991); was advisory editor at Computational Statistics Quarterly (1983–1990); associate editor for the Journal of Educational and Behavioral Statistics (1989–1991); editor for the Journal of Educational and Behavioral Statistics (1991–1997); editor for the Journal of Multivariate Analysis (1993–1997); and web editor for Institute of Mathematical Statistics (1996–1999). He is still member of the editorial board of the Journal of Classification (since 1984); member of the advisory board of Applied Stochastic Models and Data Analysis (since 1985); editor for Advanced Quantitative Techniques in the Social Sciences (since 1989) and editor for the Sage/SRM-Database of Social Research Methodology (since 1996). He was founding editor and editor-in-chief of the Journal of Statistical Software (1997–2015) and editor-in-chief for the Journal of Multivariate Analysis (1997–2015).

De Leeuw was elected trustee at Psychometric Society in 1985–1986 and president in 1987–1988. He was elected fellow of the Royal Statistical Society in 1984; at the International Statistical Institute in 1986; at the Royal Netherlands Academy of Arts and Sciences in 1989; at the Institute of Mathematical Statistics and at the American Statistical Association in 2001.

- De Leeuw is the originator of the Albert Gifi team that wrote Nonlinear Multivariate Analysis. In Multidimensional Scaling, Volume 1, Cox and Cox write that "Albert Gifi is the nom de plume of members, past and present, of the Department of Data Theory at the University of Leiden who devised a system of nonlinear multivariate analysis that extends various techniques, such as principal components analysis and canonical correlation analysis."
- De Leeuw is coauthor of Introducing Multilevel Modeling (1998) and co-editor of the "Handbook of Multilevel Analysis" (2009).
- A bibliography of 761 of de Leeuw's writings in the field of data analysis, statistics, and psychometrics from 1965 to 2019, with downloadable pdf's of 653 entries and web links to 100 more, is accessible from his homepage.
- Original software development : homals smacof anacor isotone aspect His more current smacof and homals software is on his GitHub page, which also has the manuscripts and supporting material for three books in progress.
- Since his retirement in 2014 De Leeuw has published more than 100 informal papers on Rpubs, on Research Gate, and on his homepage.

His former doctoral students include Willem Heiser, Jacqueline Meulman, Catrien Bijleveld, and Mine Çetinkaya-Rundel.
