= Edgar Acuña =

Peruvian academic (born 1956)

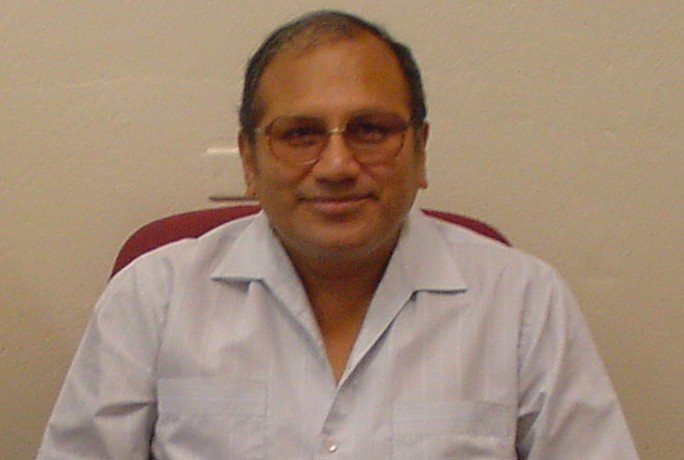
- Born: February 26, 1956; Peru
- Education: University of Rochester
- Awards: Fulbright Scholar, 2009
- Scientific career
- Fields: Statistics; Data Mining; Machine Learning; Data Science
- Institutions: PUCP; UPRMPuerto Rico
- Doctoral advisor: Johannes Kemperman

Edgar Acuña (born February 26, 1956) is a Professor of Statistics, Data Mining and Machine Learning at the University of Puerto Rico in UPRM.

== Early life and education ==
Edgar Acuña was born on February 26, 1956, in Chincha Alta, Peru. He started his elementary school education at Chala and it continued at Huacho. After finishing his high school in the Colegio Emblemático Luis Fabio Xammar Jurado at Huacho, Professor Acuña continued undergraduate studies in Statistics at the National Agrarian University, UNALM in Lima, Peru, graduate studies in Applied Mathematics at the PUCP, in Lima, Peru, and doctoral studies in Statistics at the University of Rochester in Rochester, New York.

== Honors ==
In July 2001, Acuña was considered by the Hispanic Engineer & IT magazine as one of the scientists to watch. In July 2003, he was considered by the same magazine among the Hispanic Power Hitters in Technology and Business. In 2009, was selected as Fulbright Scholar to visit Peruvian Universities.

== Selected publications ==
Acuña is the author of "Statistical Analysis using Minitab" (written in Spanish) and published by Wiley and Sons in 2002.

He has several publications in data pre-processing for data mining and machine learning. In particular, in handling of missing values, outlier detection, and feature selection. Acuña along with his research group has developed the dprep library written in the R language. This library contains several R functions to perform data-peprocessing tasks.
