= Martha Siegel =

American mathematician

Martha Jochnowitz Siegel is an American applied mathematician, probability theorist and mathematics educator who served as the editor of Mathematics Magazine from 1991 to 1996. In 2017 she won the Yueh-Gin Gung and Dr. Charles Y. Hu Award for Distinguished Service of the Mathematical Association of America for "her remarkable leadership in guiding the national conversation on undergraduate mathematics curriculum". She was a faculty member in the mathematics department of Towson University from 1971 until 2015, when she became a professor emerita.

== Education and career ==
Siegel grew up in Brooklyn, the daughter of civil engineer Nat Jochnowitz. She became interested in mathematics through her father's interest in mathematical puzzles, and through the calculation of baseball statistics for the Brooklyn Dodgers. She did her undergraduate studies in mathematics at Russell Sage College, a small women's college in Troy, New York, while also taking classes at the nearby men-only Rensselaer Polytechnic Institute, as at that time Russell Sage had no mathematics department. At Russell Sage, she was a Kellas honor student, and president of the science club. She completed her Ph.D. in 1969 at the University of Rochester; her dissertation, On Birth and Death Processes, was supervised by Johannes Kemperman. During graduate school and until her 1971 move to Towson, she was on the faculty at Goucher College.

== Contributions ==
At Towson, in 1981, Siegel founded an innovative and still-ongoing undergraduate applied mathematics program involving projects connected to local business and government. She is a co-author of the discrete mathematics and precalculus textbooks Finite Mathematics and Its Applications and Functioning in the Real World. She also served as chair of a committee of the Mathematical Association of America charged with producing the 2015 edition of their MAA Curriculum Guide to Undergraduate Majors in the Mathematical Sciences.
