= Mine Çetinkaya-Rundel =

Turkish mathematician

- Born: Mine Çetinkaya; 1982 (age 43–44)
- Citizenship: Turkey
- Education: Robert College; New York University (BS); University of California, Los Angeles (MS, PhD)
- Known for: OpenIntro Statistics
- Awards: Fellow of the American Statistical Association (2020)
- Scientific career
- Fields: Statistics; Data science
- Workplaces: Duke University; University of Edinburgh; Buck consultants
- Thesis: Estimating the impact of air pollution using small area estimation (2011)
- Doctoral advisor: Jan de Leeuw
- Website: mine-cr.com

Mine Çetinkaya-Rundel (born 1982) is a Turkish-American statistician and professor of the practice at Duke University, and a professional educator at RStudio. She is the author of several open source statistics textbooks and is an instructor for Coursera. She is the chair-elect of the Statistical Education Section of the American Statistical Association. Previously, she was a senior lecturer at University of Edinburgh.

== Education ==
Çetinkaya-Rundel grew up in Turkey and graduated from Robert College, before coming to the United States for her undergraduate studies to study actuarial science at New York University. After working as an actuary at Buck Consultants, Çetinkaya-Rundel enrolled in graduate school at the University of California, Los Angeles. She earned her master's degree and PhD in statistics at UCLA where her dissertation on estimating the impact of air pollution was supervised of Jan de Leeuw.

== Research and career ==
Çetinkaya-Rundel coauthored three open-access textbooks, OpenIntro Statistics, Introductory Statistics with Randomization and Simulation, and OpenIntro: Advanced High School Statistics. She is an author on the associated R package, openintro. Çetinkaya-Rundel is also a proponent of reproducible analysis in the context of statistics education.

=== Awards and honours ===
Çetinkaya-Rundel was elected as a Fellow of the American Statistical Association (ASA) in 2020. She was elected chair of the ASA Statistical Computing program in 2021.

=== Selected publications ===
- R for Data Science
- Introductory statistics with randomization and simulation
- OpenIntro Statistics
- Advanced High School Statistics
