= Leonard Mirman =

American economist

Leonard J. Mirman
- Born: March 19, 1940; New York City
- Died: September 6, 2017 (aged 77)
- Education: University of Rochester; New York University; Brooklyn College
- Scientific career
- Fields: Mathematical economics Econometrics
- Workplaces: University of Virginia
- Doctoral advisor: Johannes Kemperman

Leonard Jay Mirman (March 19, 1940 – September 6, 2017) was an American mathematician and economist. He was the Paul G. McIntire Professor of Economics at the University of Virginia. Mirman was known for his contributions to economics of uncertainty.

A native of New York City, Mirman earned a bachelor's (1963) and a master's degree (1965) in mathematics from Brooklyn College and New York University, respectively. Then he enrolled at the University of Rochester, majoring in economics. He received his MA in June 1968, and his Ph.D. in 1970.

While still a graduate student, Mirman started a paper with William A. Brock, who was then an assistant professor in the department, that augmented the Ramsey–Cass–Koopmans model with stochastic technology progress. As business cycle fluctuations arise naturally in this setup, the Brock–Mirman model became the foundation of real business cycle theory, which is at the heart of modern macroeconomics and growth theory.
