= Willem Albert Wagenaar =

Dutch psychologist

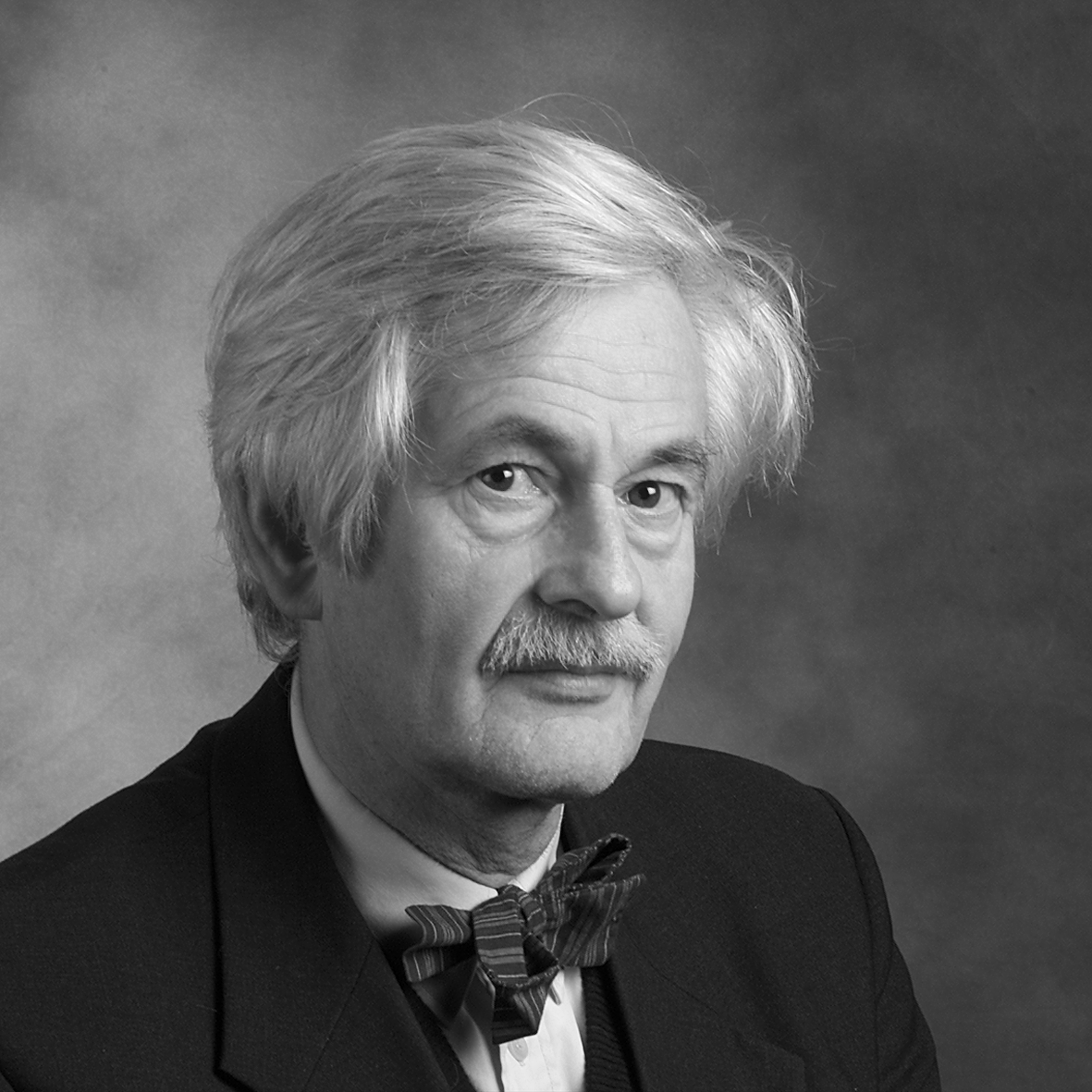
W.A. Wagenaar (photo: Collection Universiteit Leiden)

Willem Albert Wagenaar (30 June 1941 in Utrecht – 27 April 2011) was a Dutch psychologist noted for his work on the reliability of memory. He gained fame as an expert witness in some high-profile legal cases.

== Life and work ==
Wagenaar studied experimental psychology at Utrecht University, where he obtained his doctorandus degree cum laude in Social Sciences in 1965. On 19 January 1972, he obtained a PhD degree in Social Sciences at the Leiden University. His thesis at Leiden, called "Sequential Response Bias. A study on choice and chance", was sponsored by Professor John P. van de Geer. From 1973 to 1974 Wagenaar received a Fulbright grant to act as a visiting professor at Pennsylvania State University.

Wagenaar was then head of the psychology department from 1974 to 1985 at the Institute for Perception TNO at Soesterberg, The Netherlands. Wagenaar was also an experimental psychology professor at Leiden University from 1982 to 1985. Wagenaar received a tenured position at Leiden University in 1985, a position he held until retirement. While at Leiden University, Wagenaar would also serve as faculty dean and Rector Magnificus from 1997 until 2001. Starting in 2004 Wagenaar worked as a psychology of law professor at Utrecht University - he gave a course on "Psychology in the Courtroom" at University College Utrecht. He retired in 2009.

Wagenaar was elected a member of the Royal Netherlands Academy of Arts and Sciences in 1991.

On 17 January 2013, the Prof. Dr. W.A. Wagenaar foundation was founded, initiated by Professor Corine de Ruiter. The foundation is part of the Limburg University Fund and is intended to support the Masters in Forensic Psychology at Maastricht University.

=== Expert witness ===
Wagenaar was called as an expert witness at a series of high-profile cases. These included the trial of John Demjanjuk who was accused of being the Nazi war criminal known as Ivan the Terrible. Wagenaar was also an expert in the "Yolanda van B. case", a much publicised Dutch incest trial. In these cases his testimony focused on the reliability or other aspects of eye witness memory.

=== Magic Lanterns ===
Wagenaar was a collector of magic lanterns. He was so fond of the lanterns that he built a home theater for them and wrote an academic article on their origins.

== Selected publications ==
- Wagenaar, Willem Albert. Sequential response bias: A study on choice and chance. Diss. Bronder-Offset, 1972.
- Wagenaar, Willem Albert. Paradoxes of gambling behaviour. Lawrence Erlbaum Associates, Inc, 1988.
- Wagenaar, Willem Albert. Identifying Ivan: A case study in legal psychology. Harvard University Press, 1988.
- Wagenaar, Willem Albert, Henricus Florentine Maria Crombag, and H. F. M. Crombag. The popular policeman and other cases: Psychological perspectives on legal evidence. Amsterdam University Press, 2005.

Articles, a selection:

- Wagenaar, Willem Albert. "The True Inventor of the Magic Lantern: Kircher, Walgenstein or Huygens?." Janus Leiden 56.1-2-3 (1979): 193-207.

Academic offices
Preceded by Lammert Leertouwer	Rector Magnificus and President of Leiden University; 1997–2001	Succeeded by Douwe Breimer
