= Linda van der Gaag =

Dutch computer scientist

Linda Christina van der Gaag (born 1959) is a Dutch computer scientist whose research concerns artificial intelligence for medical decision support systems, including graphical models, Bayesian networks, and expert systems. She is SUPSI Professor at the Dalle Molle Institute for Artificial Intelligence Research in Switzerland.

== Education and career ==
Van der Gaag completed a doctorate in 1990 at the University of Amsterdam, with the dissertation Probability-Based Models for Plausible Reasoning, jointly promoted by Jan Bergstra and Richard D. Gill.

She became a professor at Utrecht University, and head of the Department of Information and Computing Sciences, before moving to the Dalle Molle Institute for Artificial Intelligence Research (IDSIA) in 2019. At IDSIA, she was named SUPSI Professor in 2020.

== Book ==
With Peter J. F. Lucas, van der Gaag is the coauthor of the book Principles of Expert Systems (Addison-Wesley, 1991).

== Recognition ==
Van der Gaag is a Fellow of the European Association for Artificial Intelligence.
