= Willem Heiser =

Dutch social scientist (born 1949)

Willem Jan Heiser (born 19 January 1949) is a Dutch social scientist who was Professor of Psychology, Statistical Methods and Data Theory at the Leiden University between 1989 and 2014.

== Biography ==
Heiser was born on 19 January 1949 in Rotterdam. He received his PhD in 1981 from the Leiden University with a thesis entitled "Unfolding analysis of proximity data" advised by John van de Geer and Jan de Leeuw. In the year 1981-82 he performed Postdoctoral research at Bell Labs in New Jersey.

Back at the University of Leiden in 1982 he joined the Department of Data Theory, were in April 1989 he was appointed Professor of Psychology & Statistics. Since 2007 he has been Scientific director of the Interuniversity Graduate School for Psychometrics and Sociometrics, and since 2008 also scientific director of the Institute of Psychology at the University of Leiden. From 2002 to 2015 he served as Editor-in-Chief of the Journal of Classification.

Heiser's research interests are in the fields of "multivariate categorical data using multidimensional scaling and classification techniques... advanced clustering and classification methodology for FMRI data."

At his farewell speech on 31 January 2014, Heiser was knighted in the Order of the Dutch Lion by the mayor of Leiden, Henri Lenferink.

== Publications ==
Heiser has authored and co-authored numerous publications

- 1981. Unfolding analysis of proximity data. Doctorate thesis Rijksuniversiteit Leiden.
- 1994. Models for Asymmetric Proximities. With Berrie Zielman.
- 2001. SPSS Categories 11.0 . With Jacqueline Meulman. Chicago: SPSS, 2001.

Articles, a selection:

- Heiser, Willem J. "Convergent computation by iterative majorization: theory and applications in multidimensional data analysis." Recent advances in descriptive multivariate analysis (1995): 157-189.
- Groenen, Patrick JF, and Willem J. Heiser. "The tunneling method for global optimization in multidimensional scaling." Psychometrika 61.3 (1996): 529-550.
- Meulman, Jacqueline J., Anita J. Van der Kooij, and Willem J. Heiser. "Principal components analysis with nonlinear optimal scaling transformations for ordinal and nominal data." Handbook of quantitative methodology for the social sciences (2004): 49-70.
