= Lucy Letby =

British nurse convicted of murder (born 1990)

- Letby following her arrest in 2020
- Born: 4 January 1990 (age 36); Hereford, England
- Education: University of Chester (BSN)
- Occupation: Former NHS nurse
- Status: Imprisoned at HM Prison Bronzefield, Surrey
- Convictions: Murder (7 counts); Attempted murder (8 counts)
- Penalty: Life imprisonment (15 whole life orders) (Note: A whole life order means life imprisonment without the possibility of parole.)

Details
- Span of crimes: June 2015 – June 2016
- Country: England
- Location: Cheshire
- Killed: 7 babies (known)

Lucy Letby (born 4 January 1990) is a British former NHS neonatal nurse convicted of murdering seven babies and attempting to murder seven others at the Countess of Chester Hospital in Chester between June 2015 and June 2016. She was investigated after an unusual cluster of deaths in the hospital's neonatal unit.

Charged in November 2020 with seven counts of murder and fifteen counts of attempted murder relating to seventeen babies, Letby was prosecuted on the basis of her presence at many of the incidents, two abnormal blood test results and skin discolouration interpreted as signs of insulin poisoning and air embolism, inconsistencies in medical records, her removal of nursing handover sheets from the hospital, and handwritten notes interpreted by the prosecution as a confession.

In August 2023, she was found guilty on seven counts each of murder and attempted murder, and acquitted on two counts of attempted murder. The jury was unable to reach verdicts on six further counts. She received fourteen whole life orders, meaning life imprisonment without the possibility of parole. One of the unresolved attempted murder charges was retried in July 2024, resulting in a fifteenth whole life order.

The senior management of the Countess of Chester Hospital was criticised for failing to act on clinicians' concerns, prompting the British government to commission an independent inquiry. Cheshire Police examined extra cases, resulting in three arrests related to corporate manslaughter.

Two applications for permission to appeal have been refused by the Court of Appeal. Multiple experts have since challenged the prosecution's interpretation of the medical evidence, arguing that the infants' deaths were explainable by natural causes. The Criminal Cases Review Commission is considering referring the case back to the Court of Appeal.

== Early life and education ==
Lucy Letby was born on 4 January 1990 in Hereford, the only child of a furniture salesman and an accounts clerk. She attended St. James' Church of England primary school, Aylestone School and Hereford Sixth Form College. According to a friend interviewed by the BBC, she had long expressed an interest in neonatal nursing.

Letby studied child nursing at the University of Chester, completing clinical placements at Liverpool Women's Hospital and the Countess of Chester Hospital. During her final year she failed an assessed placement but passed a subsequent retrieval placement after requesting a different assessor. One of her assessors later told the 2024 statutory inquiry that she had considered Letby inexperienced and lacking confidence in some clinical areas. Letby graduated with a Bachelor of Science in Nursing with a speciality in child nursing in September 2011 and completed a further placement at Liverpool Women's Hospital the following year.

== Career ==
Letby began working as a registered nurse in the neonatal unit at the Countess of Chester Hospital on 2 January 2012. In 2012 and 2013 she took part in a fundraising campaign for a new neonatal unit. Colleagues later recalled that she sometimes described non‑intensive care work as boring. She completed another specialisation course in March 2014 and had a second placement at Liverpool Women's Hospital in early 2015.

In July 2013, Letby set a morphine infusion rate incorrectly, leading the deputy ward manager to suspend her from administering controlled drugs and require additional training. The suspension was lifted a week later after she raised the matter with the unit manager. In April 2016, she administered antibiotics that had not been prescribed, which she described as a minor error, and she was subsequently moved from night shifts to day shifts.

In June 2016, consultant paediatrician and neonatal-unit lead clinician Stephen Brearey asked hospital management to remove Letby from clinical duties pending an investigation. She was transferred to the patient experience team the following month and later to the risk and patient safety office, where she remained until her arrest in 2018.

After an interim suspension in 2020, the Nursing and Midwifery Council struck off Letby's registration on 12 December 2023 after her conviction. Letby had informed the council that she did not accept guilt but would not contest her removal.

== Initial investigations ==
Concerns about an increase in infant collapses (Note: Collapse refers to a life-threatening condition where the infant is in severe cardiorespiratory distress, such that resuscitation with intermittent positive pressure ventilation is required.) and deaths in the neonatal unit at the Countess of Chester Hospital first arose in June 2015, when four collapses occurred, three of them fatal. The unit normally recorded two or three deaths a year. The unit manager, Eirian Powell, and unit lead clinician Brearey carried out an informal review and reported the incidents to the trust's serious‑incident committee, which classified the deaths as medication errors. Brearey noted that Letby had been on duty for each incident but regarded this as an unsurprising coincidence, given staffing levels. He later told the statutory inquiry that no concerns had been raised about her practice at the time. Subsequent reporting in 2023 indicated that he had developed suspicions earlier and believed the trust failed to act on them.

A Care Quality Commission inspection in February 2016 heard concerns about difficulties raising issues with managers but was not informed of an elevated mortality rate. Its report highlighted staffing and skill‑mix problems but described a generally positive organisational culture. In May 2016, the trust's executive team concluded that the rise in deaths was coincidental. National MBRRACE‑UK data later showed that the unit's neonatal death rate between June 2015 and June 2016 was at least 10 per cent higher than expected, with deaths in 2015 double those of the previous year.

On 24 June 2016, following two further deaths, Brearey asked the duty executive to remove Letby from clinical duties, but was told she was safe to work. The trust's executive directors discussed involving the police but instead commissioned a review by the Royal College of Paediatrics and Child Health (RCPCH). Letby was taken off the unit on 30 June, and the hospital subsequently reduced cot capacity and raised the gestational‑age threshold for admissions.

The RCPCH review began in September 2016. Its October report found no definitive explanation for the increased mortality rate but identified inadequate staffing and senior cover. It described concerns about Letby as subjective and unsupported by evidence. The trust's medical director asked consultant neonatologist Jane Hawdon to undertake detailed case reviews recommended by the RCPCH. Hawdon instead conducted a review of medical notes relating to 17 deaths and collapses; she was understood to have told the hospital's medical director that she had not been able to conduct the thorough review that the RCPCH had recommended due to not having had the time, and later said that she had not been "adequately briefed" about the concerns about Letby before she carried out her analysis. The report concluded that most of the deaths and collapses could be explained and might have been preventable with different care, while four warranted further local forensic review. Minutes of a subsequent board meeting recorded the medical director stating that the RCPCH and Hawdon reviews attributed the deaths to leadership and intervention issues; the board chair later said he had been misled about the depth of Hawdon's review.

Letby lodged a formal grievance in September 2016 regarding her removal from clinical duties. The trust upheld the grievance in January 2017, concluding that her transfer had been orchestrated by consultants without firm evidence. The chief executive apologised to Letby and her parents in December 2016 and instructed consultants to apologise to her in writing.

In March 2017, four consultants, including Brearey and Ravi Jayaram, again asked management to involve the police after receiving advice from the regional neonatal lead. They met Cheshire Constabulary on 27 April, shortly before Letby was due to return to clinical work. The trust publicly announced police involvement in May 2017, stating that it sought assurances to rule out unnatural causes of death. The resulting investigation was named Operation Hummingbird. Senior Investigating Officer Paul Hughes later said the inquiry initially considered a range of natural and clinical explanations alongside the possibility of inflicted harm.

After reading about the investigation, retired paediatrician and expert witness Dewi Evans contacted the National Crime Agency offering assistance. He was instructed to review clinical records for 61 cases of sudden collapse or death. Evans produced multiple reports for Cheshire Police, and his conclusions were peer-reviewed by consultant neonatologist Sandie Bohin. He also advised on the appointment of further specialist experts. The police ultimately narrowed the investigation to 22 cases, which formed the basis of the charges at Letby's trial.

== 2023 trial ==
Police arrested Letby on 3 July 2018 on suspicion of eight counts of murder and six counts of attempted murder, and searched her home. Officers were also seen at her parents' property the same day. Following her arrest, detectives began reviewing her entire nursing career, including her time at Liverpool Women's Hospital. She was bailed on 6 July, rearrested in June 2019, and bailed again shortly afterwards. Letby was arrested for a third time in November 2020 and was remanded in custody. She denied all allegations, attributing the collapses to issues such as staffing levels and hygiene.

Letby's trial opened at Manchester Crown Court on 4 October 2022 before Mr Justice Goss. She pleaded not guilty to seven counts of murder and 15 counts of attempted murder.

The infants were anonymised as Baby A to Baby Q. Reporting restrictions also protected the identities of nine colleagues who gave evidence. Two years before the trial, Mrs Justice Steyn had ordered that the surviving infants could not be identified until adulthood. Several adult witnesses were also granted anonymity, which the court considered necessary to secure their testimony.

=== Evidence ===
At trial, the prosecution presented evidence from parents, clinicians and expert witnesses. The mother of Baby E testified that she had heard her son cry and found blood around his mouth while Letby was present; Letby attributed the blood to a nasogastric tube. Baby E died later that day. Letby subsequently sent a sympathy card to the family, photographs of which were later found on her phone. The court also heard that she had been advised more than once not to enter a room where bereaved parents were grieving.

Prosecutors cited text messages sent by Letby to colleagues, which they said showed inappropriate interest in clinical events. Messages included offers to take additional intensive‑care shifts shortly after deaths or collapses, expressions of frustration when not allocated to intensive‑care rooms, and comments about fate following a series of deaths. The court also heard that Letby had searched for the families of several infants on Facebook, sometimes on anniversaries or significant dates. She told the jury this reflected general curiosity and frequent phone use.

Consultants testified that they believed suspicious incidents began after Letby qualified to work in intensive care in 2015 and that the pattern of collapses shifted after she was moved from night to day shifts in 2016. One consultant said he had found Letby standing over a deteriorating infant in February 2016 and believed she had not intervened promptly; the infant survived. Other clinicians described a cluster of near‑fatal collapses between March and June 2016, including the deaths of two triplets on consecutive days.

The prosecution alleged that two infants, Baby F and Baby L, had been deliberately poisoned with insulin, citing blood test results identified during the police investigation. Their lead expert witness described this as key evidence, though their interpretation has since been questioned by some specialists. The prosecution also argued that Baby M, the twin of Baby L, collapsed after air was injected into his bloodstream. Letby had volunteered for the shift on which Baby L collapsed, despite not being scheduled for night duty.

Several consultants told the court they had previously raised concerns about Letby but were discouraged by hospital managers. One doctor recalled Letby making a remark shortly before an infant's death that he interpreted as inappropriate. The prosecution also presented a shift‑pattern chart showing Letby on duty for 25 incidents, supported by swipe‑card data. The chart has since been criticised by some statisticians as misleading. After Letby was removed from clinical duties, the unit's admission criteria were tightened to stop receiving the sickest babies, and more consultants were hired; the unexpected deaths ceased. The prosecution further alleged that Letby altered times on patient records; she denied this, saying any discrepancies were errors.

==== Handwritten notes ====
Police searches of Letby's home and her handbag recovered several handwritten notes containing statements including "I killed them on purpose because I'm not good enough to care for them", "I am evil I did this", but also phrases such as "I haven't done anything wrong". The prosecution characterised some of the phrases as incriminating, while the defence said they reflected emotional turmoil during employment disputes and the stress of being removed from clinical duties. Letby denied that the notes were a confession. Some criminology experts have since questioned the prosecution's interpretation, and The Guardian, relying on "sources close to the case", reported that the notes had been written on her GP's advice as a coping mechanism. The suggestion that writing the notes had been advised as part of counselling was not mentioned by Letby's appeal application.

==== Medical records ====
Police searches of Letby's home recovered sensitive medical documents, including nursing handover sheets, resuscitation records and blood‑gas printouts. A total of 257 sheets were found, 21 of which related to infants she was later accused of harming. Letby told the court that she often forgot to remove paperwork from her pockets after shifts and described herself as someone who "collect[ed] paper". She also said she had been unable to destroy the documents, although a paper shredder was found in her home.

=== Letby's testimony ===
Letby gave evidence in May 2023. Under questioning by her defence barrister, she became tearful and said she had been made to feel incompetent but had "meant no harm." She told the court that the allegations had severely affected her mental health and left her feeling isolated from colleagues. Reporting from the trial noted that she sometimes contradicted herself, became confused about aspects of her account and grew increasingly frustrated during cross‑examination, which observers contrasted with her usual calm presentation.

=== Defence arguments ===
Letby's defence argued that she was a dedicated nurse working within a system that had failed, and that the prosecution's case relied on assumptions of deliberate harm combined with her presence during certain incidents. They contended that shortcomings in staffing and care on the neonatal unit were extensive and could not reasonably be attributed to a single individual. The defence also suggested that "extraordinary bleeding" in one infant might have been caused by medical equipment rather than deliberate injury.

Counsel for the defence maintained that the prosecution had not presented sufficient evidence to support its theories of how the infants were harmed. They argued that the evidence for air embolism was too weak to sustain the allegation and noted that the term did not appear in Letby's internet search history. No independent medical experts were called by the defence.

The only defence witness other than Letby was a plumber who testified that the unit had recurring plumbing problems, including sewage backing up into sinks, which he said required frequent call‑outs. The defence suggested that such hygiene issues could have contributed to the unit's elevated mortality rate. In later reporting, Dewi Evans acknowledged that pseudomonas had been detected in the unit's water supply, leading to several cases of pneumonia.

The defence submitted that there was no case to answer on the air‑embolism allegations, arguing that the prosecution's experts lacked sufficient clinical experience, that the research basis for air embolism was inconsistent, and that expert descriptions of the condition varied. Goss ruled that there was "a sufficient body of accepted medical opinion" to allow the allegation to be considered by the jury.

=== Verdicts and sentencing ===
Final verdicts were delivered on 18 August 2023. Letby was found guilty of seven counts of murder and seven counts of attempted murder relating to six further infants. Eleven of the convictions were reached by a 10–1 majority, while the verdicts concerning Children F, L and O were unanimous. She was acquitted on two counts of attempted murder, and the jury was unable to reach verdicts on six additional attempted murder charges. The prosecution requested 28 days to consider whether to seek a retrial on those counts.

Convictions from the first trial
Count	Baby	Charge	Date of death/collapse	Mechanism	Gestational age (weeks)	Birth weight (kg)	Age at death
1	A	Murder	8 June 2015	Air embolus	31		24 hours
2	B	Attempted murder	9/10 June 2015	Air embolus	31		N/A
3	C	Murder	14 June 2015	Air via nasogastric tube	30	0.8	N/A
4	D	Murder	22 June 2015	Air embolus	37	3.175	36 hours
5	E	Murder	4 August 2015	Acute bleeding/air embolus	29	1.3	6 days
6	F	Attempted Murder	5 August 2015	Insulin poisoning	29		N/A
7	G	Attempted Murder	7 September 2015	Overfeeding with milk	23	0.51	N/A
8	G	Attempted Murder	21 September 2015	Overfeeding with milk	23	0.51	N/A
12	I	Murder	23 October 2015	Air via nasogastric tube/air embolus	27	0.97	77 days
15	L	Attempted Murder	9/11 April 2016	Insulin poisoning	33		N/A
16	M	Attempted Murder	9 April 2016	Air embolus	33		N/A
17	N	Attempted Murder	3 June 2016	Throat trauma	34	1.633	N/A
20	O	Murder	23 June 2016	Injury to liver/air embolus	33		2 days
21	P	Murder	24 June 2016	Air via nasogastric tube	33		3 days

The jury acquitted Letby of the attempted murder on counts 9 (Baby G) and 10 (Baby H), and was unable to reach verdicts on counts 11 (Baby H), 13 (Baby J), 14, (Baby K), 18 and 19 (Baby N), and 22 (Baby Q).

On 21 August 2023, Letby was sentenced to life imprisonment with a whole life order, the most severe penalty available under English law. She became the fourth woman in the UK to receive such a sentence. In his remarks, Goss described her actions as "a cruel, calculated and cynical campaign of child murder involving the smallest and most vulnerable of children", adding that "there was a deep malevolence bordering on sadism [...] you [Letby] have no remorse [...] there are no mitigating factors [...] the offences are of sufficient severity to require a whole life order."

Letby chose not to attend the sentencing hearing and therefore did not hear the victim impact statements or the sentence being passed. In response, the Secretary of State for Justice, Alex Chalk, said the government would "look at options to change the law at the earliest opportunity" to require defendants to attend their sentencing.

Following the trial, Letby was transferred to HMP Low Newton in County Durham. As of February 2025, she is held at HM Prison Bronzefield.

== Motive ==
No motive was established in court, and none is required for a conviction. Prosecutors suggested several possible explanations, including boredom, thrill‑seeking and "playing God". They also stated that Letby had formed an inappropriate emotional attachment to a married doctor involved in some of the cases, citing frequent text exchanges and a note found in her home containing phrases such as "I trusted you with everything and loved you", "You were my best friend" and "Please help me". Letby denied that she had a relationship with, or feelings for, the doctor.

Commentators drew comparisons with the Beverley Allitt case. The former detective who led the Allitt investigation suggested that Letby might have imitated Allitt's methods. Criminal psychologists Dominic Wilmott and David Holmes proposed that Letby could have been motivated by factitious disorder imposed on another, a theory also raised in relation to Allitt.^{31:15} David Wilson, an emeritus professor of criminology, argued in an August 2023 opinion piece that Letby was driven by a "hero complex".

== Post-conviction ==
=== Appeal ===
In January 2024, Letby applied to the Court of Appeal for permission to challenge her convictions, but this was refused by a single judge. She renewed her application, and at a three‑day hearing in April 2024 her legal team advanced four grounds of appeal relating to the trial judge's rulings. In May 2024, a panel comprising Dame Victoria Sharp, Lord Justice Holroyde and Mrs Justice Lambert refused permission to appeal.

As part of the appeal, Letby's counsel, Ben Myers, again challenged the admission of evidence from paediatrician Evans, arguing that it should have been excluded on the basis that Evans had been "dogmatic and biased". The appeal judges rejected this, finding that Evans did not lack impartiality, was suitably qualified to give expert evidence, and that it was for the jury to assess its weight.

A second ground of appeal concerned the medical evidence relating to alleged fatal air injections, which the defence described as "very weak". A third ground argued that the trial judge had erred in directing the jury that they could convict even if they were uncertain about the precise method used in each case. The final ground alleged that the judge had failed to investigate a question of juror impartiality. All four grounds were dismissed, with the Court concluding in its written judgement that the trial had been "thoughtful, fair, comprehensive and correct" and that none of the challenges raised by the defence were "arguable".

=== Retrial ===
At a hearing on 25 September 2023, the Crown Prosecution Service confirmed that there would be a retrial on one of the six attempted‑murder counts on which the original jury had been unable to reach a verdict. The retrial was scheduled to take place after the Court of Appeal had considered whether Letby would be granted permission to appeal her existing convictions.

The retrial began on 10 June 2024. On 2 July, Letby was found guilty of attempted murder, and on 5 July she received a further whole‑life order.

On 24 October 2024, Letby applied for permission to appeal this conviction, arguing that prejudicial media coverage should have prevented the trial from proceeding. The Court of Appeal rejected the application.

=== Further investigations and arrests ===
Following the verdict, police continued to investigate whether Letby had harmed other infants. Detectives reviewed around 30 cases at the Countess of Chester Hospital that had been identified as "suspicious". Neonatologists examined approximately 4,000 admissions at that hospital, where Letby had worked from 2012, and at Liverpool Women's Hospital, where she had completed two placements in 2012 and 2015, and were asked to refer any "unexpected and unexplained" deteriorations to police. At least one family was informed that their child's case at Liverpool Women's Hospital formed part of the inquiry. Cheshire Police interviewed Letby under caution in relation to deaths at both hospitals. On 2 July 2025, the Crown Prosecution Service confirmed that it was considering further charges based on new evidence provided by the police. On 20 January 2026, after reviewing evidence relating to allegations of murder involving two children and attempted murder involving seven others, the Crown Prosecution Service announced that no further charges would be brought against Letby.

On 4 October 2023, Cheshire Constabulary announced an investigation into potential corporate manslaughter at the Countess of Chester Hospital. On 1 July 2025, three members of the hospital's former senior leadership team were arrested on suspicion of gross negligence manslaughter. On 22 April 2026 one of the three was arrested and bailed for perverting the course of justice.

=== Thirlwall inquiry ===
After Letby's conviction, the British government announced an independent inquiry into "the circumstances surrounding the deaths and incidents, including how concerns raised by clinicians were dealt with". It was initially established on a non‑statutory basis, meaning witnesses could not be compelled to give evidence and inquests would still be required. Senior figures at the Countess of Chester Hospital, including the medical director, chief executive and nursing director at the time of the incidents, said they would cooperate. The medical director retired in August 2018, and the chief executive resigned the following month after signing a non‑disclosure agreement.

Families represented by the law firm Slater and Gordon called for the inquiry to be given statutory powers, arguing that a non‑statutory process relied on the goodwill of witnesses. Similar calls were made by former Justice Secretary Sir Robert Buckland, Chester MP Samantha Dixon, Steve Brine, chair of the Health and Social Care Select Committee, Sir Keir Starmer, then Leader of the Opposition, and Rob Behrens, the Parliamentary and Health Service Ombudsman.

In August 2024, a group of 24 neonatal and statistical experts wrote to ministers requesting that the inquiry be postponed and its terms amended, citing concerns about the safety of Letby's convictions. The inquiry declined to make changes.

Education Secretary Gillian Keegan said the type of inquiry would be reviewed once a chair was appointed. On 30 August 2023, Health Secretary Steve Barclay announced that it would be upgraded to a statutory inquiry, enabling witnesses to be compelled to give evidence.

The inquiry, chaired by Lady Justice Thirlwall, formally opened on 22 November 2023. The public hearings began on 10 September 2024. In a ruling on 29 May 2024, the chair determined that remote live viewing would be available to Core Participants, their legal representatives and the media, but not to the wider public. During the hearings, colleagues gave evidence describing Letby as "excited and gossipy" when discussing the death of an infant, saying she preferred caring for unwell babies, complained when moved to less acute areas, and expressed eagerness for the first death of an infant to "get it out of the way".

Former Health Secretary Jeremy Hunt apologised to families during the 2025 hearings, saying the government had taken "too long" to act.

Letby's lawyers and other supporters later asked for the inquiry to be paused while her application to the Criminal Cases Review Commission was considered. Thirlwall rejected the request in March 2025 and said she intended to deliver her report in November 2025.

In April 2026, the inquiry said that work on the report was still ongoing and that a publication date could not be confirmed.

On 15 September 2026, the Thirlwall Inquiry report was published and found that there had been a "complete failure" to prevent babies being harmed, with criticisms including that there were opportunities to prevent further murders, that a doctor disregarded insulin test results for Baby F that should have resulted in safeguarding actions being taken, and that hospital managers failed to be honest and open to parents, regulators and investigators. The report was highly critical of Letby, stating that "her inappropriate and callous nature was noted by patients and colleagues" and was released whilst the Criminal Cases Review Commission was assessing evidence submitted by an international panel of experts, in relation to Letby's convictions.

=== New defence team ===
In September 2024, Letby appointed a new defence lawyer, Mark McDonald. At a press conference in December 2024, McDonald said he was preparing fresh applications to both the Court of Appeal and the Criminal Cases Review Commission. He argued that the prosecution's lead expert witness, Dewi Evans, was unreliable, claiming that Evans had altered his views on how some infants had died. McDonald also said that several experts were producing reports on the infants' deaths without payment, and that two reports—relating to Children C and O—had concluded that there was no evidence of deliberate harm.

Following the press conference, Evans rejected the criticisms, describing them as "unsubstantiated, unfounded, inaccurate". He said the only change in his evidence concerned the date of Child C's death, which he attributed to a clerical error by the prosecution. Some of Evans's post‑trial comments about the mechanisms of death differed from positions he had taken while giving evidence at trial.

On 4 February 2025, Letby's legal team applied for her case to be reviewed as a potential miscarriage of justice. On the same day, findings from a panel of 14 international medical experts were released. Chaired by Shoo Lee, a retired neonatologist from the University of Toronto, the panel concluded that there was no medical evidence supporting claims that Letby had deliberately harmed or murdered infants at the Countess of Chester Hospital. The panel attributed many of the deaths to natural causes or substandard care, citing issues such as inadequate staffing and delays in essential treatment, and argued that the deaths were unrelated to deliberate actions by Letby.

On 14 September 2026, Helen Shannon, a chemical engineering expert, and Geoff Chase, a professor of bioengineering, resigned from Letby's legal team, saying that some of the arguments being put forward on Letby's behalf regarding two infants were "inconsistent with the available evidence, science and established physiology".

=== Inquests ===
Inquests into the deaths of five babies were opened on 4 February 2026. English law limits the verdicts available to coroners when criminal convictions have already been returned.

== Reactions ==
=== Calls for regulation and reform ===
The British Medical Association called for a formal mechanism to hold NHS managers and healthcare administrators accountable for mismanagement, comparable to the General Medical Council's ability to strike off doctors. A neonatal consultant who had raised concerns about Letby also urged the introduction of regulation for healthcare management.

The Parliamentary and Health Service Ombudsman, Rob Behrens, said that radical reform of NHS management was needed to prevent similar failures. Dewi Evans called for an investigation into potential corporate manslaughter in relation to the case. Dame Ruth May, NHS England's Chief Nursing Officer, stated that the NHS was committed to learning from the case and welcomed the independent inquiry announced by the Department of Health and Social Care.

On 21 August 2023, it was announced that the nursing director at the Countess of Chester Hospital during Letby's employment had been suspended from her subsequent role at Northern Care Alliance NHS Foundation Trust, following information that emerged during the trial. The Nursing and Midwifery Council later confirmed that she would face a fitness‑to‑practise investigation. She and other senior executives at the hospital were accused of failing to act on warnings about Letby.

== Expert reviews of the evidence ==
Letby has maintained that she is innocent of the offences for which she was convicted. Following the trials, a number of medical, statistical and other scientific experts have criticised the prosecution's evidence. The defence have been criticised for failing to call any of their own expert witnesses at trial. In 2025, a panel of experts convened by neonatologist Shoo Lee, provided with the infants' records and other trial evidence by Letby's legal representatives, published an assessment of the cases which presented alternative explanations for all of the deaths and collapses. The infants' families and the prosecution's lead expert witness have disputed these findings. The Court of Appeal has previously rejected challenges to the safety of the convictions. (Note: "Safety" (of convictions) is a UK legal term equivalent to "integrity" in the US.)

=== Concerns about the medical evidence ===
Much of the medical evidence presented at trial has been criticised by experts across several specialties, including neonatology, pathology, nursing, biochemistry and forensic toxicology. Points of scrutiny have included the prosecution's assertions that the infants were clinically stable before their collapses, that alternative explanations could be excluded, and that the alleged mechanisms of harm were medically plausible. Controversy has also arisen from the fact that the original post‑mortem reports for the infants—most of whom underwent autopsy—did not identify suspicious or unnatural causes of death.

In February 2025, a panel organised and instructed by Letby's defence team that was led by neonatologist Shoo Lee released findings from their own review of the deaths and collapses. The panel claimed that all of the incidents could be explained by natural causes, substandard care, or a combination of both, and claimed no evidence of deliberate harm.

==== Insulin ====
Some experts have questioned the interpretation of blood test results used to support the allegation that Letby poisoned two infants with insulin. Several specialists have argued that the type of assay used is prone to error and unsuitable for use in a criminal trial. Guidance from the laboratory that performed the tests recommends confirmatory analysis with a more accurate method when exogenous insulin is suspected, but no such testing was undertaken. A quality-control check conducted by the laboratory around the same period produced a falsely elevated insulin reading; the jury was not informed of this.

Other experts have suggested that, even if accurate, the results may have alternative explanations. Geoff Chase, a specialist in insulin physiology in pre‑term infants, and chemical engineer Helen Shannon concluded that the prosecution underestimated the quantity of insulin that would have been required—no missing insulin was identified—and that the pattern of results could not reliably indicate insulin administration in premature infants, whose physiology differs from that of older children and adults.

A separate report by seven experts, including neonatologists, a forensic toxicologist, a forensic scientist and a paediatric endocrinologist, also raised concerns about the reliability of the assay, argued that the prosecution inappropriately relied on studies involving adults and older children, and highlighted alternative explanations for the infants' hypoglycaemia. Both reports have been submitted to the Criminal Cases Review Commission. A different paediatric endocrinologist, John Gregory, has supported the prosecution's interpretation that the results were consistent with insulin administration.

==== Air via nasogastric tube ====
Several neonatologists have described the allegation that Letby murdered three infants by injecting air into their stomachs via a nasogastric tube as implausible, variously calling the theory "nonsensical", "ridiculous", "fantastical" and "not practically feasible". An X-ray heavily relied upon by the prosecution in relation to Child C was taken when Letby had not been on shift since the infant's birth.

Following the trial, the prosecution's lead medical witness, Dr Dewi Evans, subsequently stated that he had changed his opinion regarding the cause of Baby C's death. He no longer believed that the air in Baby C's stomach, which he had told the jury had caused the infant's collapse, was responsible for his death. Instead, Evans said that the stomach bubble was not responsible for the death and that Baby C died later, as a result of air entering the bloodstream. He therefore altered his view of the precise physiological mechanism by which Baby C died, while continuing to maintain that Letby was responsible for Baby C's death. The Lee panel concluded that there was no evidence that air had been forced down any infant's nasogastric tube.

==== Air embolism ====
The prosecution cited a 1989 study by Shoo Lee and A. K. Tanswell to argue that skin discolouration observed on some infants was indicative of air embolism. After reviewing the descriptions of the discolouration, Lee said he did not consider them suggestive of air embolism and described diagnosing the condition by ruling out other causes as "a fundamental mistake of medicine". The defence sought to call Lee as an expert witness during an appeal in 2024, but the Court of Appeal ruled his evidence inadmissible on the basis that he could have been called at trial and that the prosecution had not relied solely on skin discolouration to support the diagnosis.

Lee has since published an updated version of his 1989 paper, arguing that venous air embolism has never been documented to cause patchy skin discolouration. Abid Qazi, a former NHS paediatric surgeon whose case report was cited in a prosecution expert's analysis, reviewed one of the cases and expressed scepticism about the diagnosis, saying he believed Letby had been "a victim of the poor NHS system".

The Lee panel proposed alternative explanations for the incidents attributed to air embolism and concluded that there was no evidence of the condition.

==== Liver injury ====
The prosecution argued that liver damage found at the post‑mortem of Child O could only be explained by deliberate harm, contrary to the original pathologist's view that the injury was natural. A senior perinatal pathologist who later reviewed the case said she had seen similar liver injuries arise naturally and described the prosecution expert's position as "naive". Published research documents hundreds of comparable cases occurring naturally in neonates.

A joint report by two neonatologists working with Letby's legal team argued that the injury was worsened when a doctor accidentally punctured the liver by misplacing a needle. The prosecution pathologist and an independent expert interviewed by the BBC both said there was no evidence of needle trauma, although the BBC's expert also considered deliberate harm "unlikely".

The Lee panel concluded that the doctor's needle may have penetrated the liver but considered it "highly likely" that the initial injury resulted from a traumatic delivery. They described the prosecution's blunt-force trauma hypothesis as "implausible". Neonatologist Mike Hall, who was instructed by Letby's first defence team but not called to testify, disputed the panel's traumatic‑delivery explanation but maintained that there was no evidence of deliberate harm.

==== Dislodged breathing tube ====
Letby was convicted of attempting to murder Child K by dislodging her breathing tube. Experts have questioned how this conclusion was reached when no witness saw the event and accidental dislodgement is "extremely common". The Lee panel argued that there was no evidence the tube had been displaced and that the infant's deterioration was instead caused by the tube being too small.

A consultant testified at trial that Letby failed to raise the alarm when Child K deteriorated. After the trials, an email from the same consultant dated May 2017 was disclosed in which he wrote that Letby had called him to assist the infant during the incident.

=== Quality of the statistical evidence ===
Several statisticians have criticised the prosecution's use of data. The prosecution has been accused of relying on reasoning comparable to the Texas sharpshooter fallacy and the prosecutor's fallacy. A shift chart presented to the jury, which appeared to place Letby at every suspicious incident, has been challenged on the grounds that the criteria for selecting incidents were unclear and potentially biased. Critics highlight, for instance, that some deaths and other incidents were left out, that non‑nursing staff were not included, and that the chart lacked contextual information such as relative shift frequency. Others have used wider NHS data to argue that the cluster of deaths at the unit was not statistically anomalous, and have proposed alternative explanations for the rise in mortality.

During the investigation, Cheshire Police contacted Jane Hutton, a medical statistician, and signed a consultancy agreement with her. Before she could conduct her analysis, the police cancelled this agreement and line of inquiry, citing instructions from the Crown Prosecution Service. The CPS have since denied that they made any such instructions. After the trials, Hutton became one of the experts publicly critical of the statistical evidence, arguing that it "does not hold water".

In September 2024, the Royal Statistical Society held a meeting to discuss concerns raised by its members. The prosecution's statistical evidence was strongly criticised, and comparisons were drawn with miscarriages of justice involving other nurses convicted of killing patients, including the cases of Lucia de Berk and Daniela Poggiali.

=== Staff and infrastructure issues ===
In May 2024, The New Yorker published a feature article by staff writer Rachel Aviv that questioned aspects of Letby's conviction. Aviv highlighted chronic staffing shortages on the unit, noting that staff were "overtaxed" and that only one specialist neonatologist was available. She also referred to hygiene concerns, including an earlier inquest finding that an infant had died in 2014 after a breathing tube was inserted incorrectly, and drainage problems that caused blocked pipes and occasional sewage backflow in sinks, issues that had been raised by the defence at trial.

Aviv also discussed a 2016 review by the Royal College of Paediatrics and Child Health (RCPCH) into increased mortality on the unit. After interviewing staff, the RCPCH concluded that medical and nursing staffing levels were inadequate and that the rise in mortality in 2015 was not confined to the neonatal unit. The report described Letby as "enthusiastic, capable and committed" and noted that staff were "very upset" about her removal from clinical duties. It characterised the suspicions held by some doctors as a "subjective view with no other evidence". In its public response, the hospital acknowledged problems with "staffing, competencies, leadership, team working and culture".

Because of reporting restrictions linked to Letby's impending retrial, the online version of the New Yorker article was blocked for UK readers, a decision questioned in Parliament by Conservative MP David Davis.

In August 2024, a leaked report revealed that the unit had experienced an outbreak of a dangerous bacterium during the period in which the infants Letby was convicted of murdering died. The outbreak had not been mentioned during the trials. Commenting on the report, medical microbiologist David Livermore argued that the outbreak offered a simpler explanation for the rise in deaths than deliberate harm.

=== Mislabelled door swipe data ===
During the first trial, door swipe records were used to establish Letby's presence on the neonatal unit at the time of various incidents. In August 2024, the Crown Prosecution Service confirmed that swipe data for one of the unit's doors had been mislabelled, with entries and exits reversed. The CPS did not confirm whether data for other doors had been correctly labelled. Cheshire Police reviewed the use of the incorrect data and concluded that it had been relied upon in evidence relating to nine infants, although it played a central role only in the case of Child K, for whom Letby was not convicted at the first trial.

A second door to the unit did not record entries or exits, meaning that swipe card data could not account for all movements into and out of the unit.

=== Interpretation of handwritten notes ===
During the trial, handwritten notes found at Letby's home were presented by the prosecution as amounting to a confession. Faye Skelton, a lecturer and specialist in forensic psychology, noted that the notes also contained statements denying guilt. She told Channel 5 that they were "perfectly plausible as the output of someone who is suffering extreme mental distress" and that she did not regard them as a confession or admission of guilt.

In September 2024, The Guardian reported that the notes had been written on the advice of counsellors as part of a therapeutic process. Richard Curen, chair of the Forensic Psychotherapy Society, said that "doodling, journalling is a way of taking control of your thoughts" and that he did not consider the notes to be a confession. (Note: A photograph of one of the notes in question can be found in this article: Lawrence, Felicity (9 July 2024). "Lucy Letby: killer or coincidence? Why some experts question the evidence". The Guardian.)

Gísli Guðjónsson, an expert in confession evidence, has written a report arguing that the notes should not be interpreted as a confession, emphasising the impact that the accusations were having on Letby's mental state at the time they were written.

=== Criticism of expert witnesses ===
Several medical experts have questioned the reliability of the prosecution's expert witness, Dewi Evans. Svilena Dimitrova, an NHS consultant neonatologist, and Roger Norwich, a medico-legal expert, submitted formal complaints to the General Medical Council (GMC) regarding Evans's evidence. Dimitrova told The Guardian that she believed "the theories proposed in court were not plausible and the prosecution was full of medical inaccuracies", adding that while she could not assert Letby's innocence, she saw "no proof of guilt". Evans rejected suggestions of bias and noted that the defence could have called its own expert witnesses at trial but did not do so. Other prosecution experts broadly supported Evans' conclusions.

The New Yorker reported that in an unrelated earlier case, a Court of Appeal judge had described one of Evans's expert reports as "worthless", containing opinions that were "tendentious and partisan" and outside his professional competence.

The prosecution's endocrinologist, Peter Hindmarsh, was under investigation by the GMC when he gave evidence during the trial. The investigation was prompted by "multiple and wide-ranging concerns" about his practice from both of the hospitals he was affiliated with. A medical tribunal placed restrictions on his ability to practise in January 2023, arguing that he "may pose a real risk to members of the public", which he subsequently breached, leading his employer University College London Hospitals NHS Foundation Trust to bar him from treating patients in March 2023. The latter restriction was not communicated to Letby's defence, and the jury were never told about the investigation or related concerns. Hindmarsh's testimony was central to the insulin cases. He removed himself from the GMC register in 2024, ending the investigation before its conclusion.

=== Reaction and responses to doubt ===
Evans has said he has received online abuse from supporters of Letby who question the safety of her convictions. He argued that some people struggle to accept that a perpetrator could be "a young, white, English nurse from a respectable background", citing the examples of Harold Shipman and Jimmy Savile for how an outward appearance of being "normal" had aided in hiding crimes.

A barrister representing the infants' families described doubts about the convictions as "conspiracies, some of which are grossly offensive and distressing for the families of her victims". An application by the families' legal representatives to have the Thirlwall Inquiry publicly livestreamed was rejected by the inquiry.

BBC special correspondent Judith Moritz, one of four reporters permitted in the courtroom, told The Sunday Times that public debate about the case often overlooked the jury's experience of observing Letby. Moritz said Letby appeared tearful when discussing herself, her job loss and the testifying in court by a married doctor with whom she had exchanged numerous Facebook messages, but not "particularly" affected when the infants' deaths were discussed. Moritz also said that Letby contradicted herself and attempted to "out-lawyer" the prosecutor. By contrast, Guardian correspondent Josh Halliday reported that Letby did become tearful when discussing the infants' deaths, including during police interviews. Some courtroom observers during the first trial described Letby as "aloof and indifferent" and noted her frequent claims of having no recollection of events, which they felt contributed to an impression of guilt.

=== Expert panel investigation ===
During Letby's 2022–2023 trial, the prosecution's expert witness, Dewi Evans, relied on a 1989 article by Canadian neonatologist Shoo Lee to support a diagnosis of air embolism as the mechanism of death in several cases. Lee did not learn that his research had been cited in the trial until after the verdict. He expressed concern that his work had been misapplied.

Following Letby's unsuccessful application for leave to appeal in 2024, at the instruction of Letby's defence, Lee convened a panel of 14 medical experts to "review all of the cases from the trials." Letby's defence team provided the panel with medical records and other evidence. On 3 February 2025, Lee presented the findings of his panel at a press conference. Lee stated that the panel "did not find any murders" and concluded that "in all cases, death or injury were due to natural causes or just bad medical care".

== Documentaries ==
- On 18 August 2023, BBC One broadcast the Panorama documentary Lucy Letby: The Nurse Who Killed, based on reporting by Judith Moritz.
- In 2024, Channel 5 released two documentaries Lucy Letby: Did She Really Do It? and Letby: The New Evidence. That same year, Moritz and Jonathan Coffey published Unmasking Lucy Letby: The Untold Story of the Killer Nurse.
- In 2025, ITV broadcast Lucy Letby: Beyond Reasonable Doubt?, while Channel 4 aired two series: Conviction: The Case of Lucy Letby and Lucy Letby: Murder or Mistake.
- In 2026, Netflix released a feature-length documentary titled The Investigation of Lucy Letby.

== See also ==
- List of prisoners with whole life orders
- List of serial killers in the United Kingdom
