= Sara van de Geer =

Dutch statistician

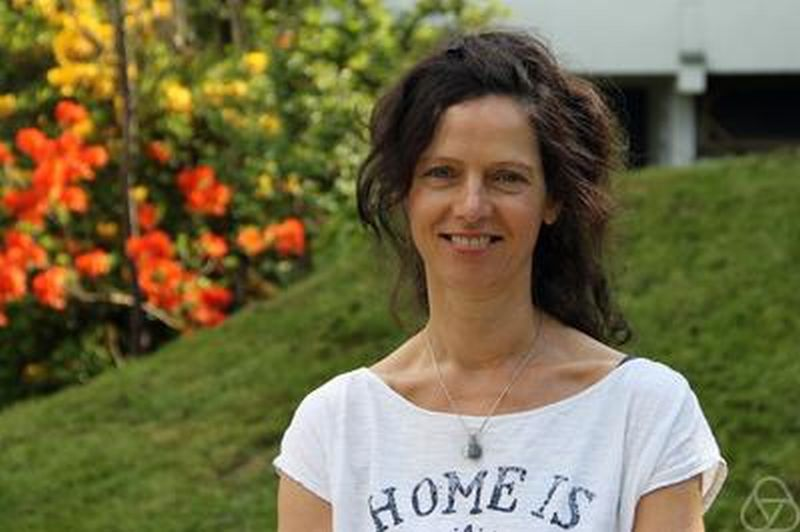
- Van der Geer in 2015
- Born: 7 May 1958 (age 68); Leiden, Netherlands
- Parent: John P. van de Geer

Academic background
- Education: Leiden University
- Thesis: Regression Analysis and Empirical Processes (1987)
- Doctoral advisor: Willem van Zwet; Richard D. Gill

Academic work
- Discipline: Statistics
- Institutions: ETH Zurich; Paul Sabatier University; Leiden University; Utrecht University; University of Bristol

Sara Anna van de Geer (born 7 May 1958 in Leiden) is a Dutch mathematical statistician who is a professor in the department of mathematics at ETH Zurich. Her main research areas include empirical process theory, statistical learning theory, and nonparametric and high-dimensional statistics. She is the daughter of psychologist John P. van de Geer.

== Education ==
She earned a Master's degree in Mathematics in 1982 and Ph.D. in Mathematics in 1987, both from the University of Leiden. Her dissertation, entitled Regression Analysis and Empirical Processes, was supervised by Willem Rutger van Zwet and Richard D. Gill.

== Career ==
Van de Geer was a Scientific Researcher at the University of Tillburg from 1982–1983, followed by two stints as a Scientific Researcher at the Centre for Mathematics and Computer Science in Amsterdam from 1983–1987 and 1988–1989. She taught as an Assistant Professor at the University of Bristol from 1987–1988, an Assistant Professor at the University of Utrecht from 1989–1990, an Assistant Professor at the University of Leiden from 1990–1997 and 1999–2005, and at Paul Sabatier University in Toulouse, France, as an Associate Professor from 1997–1999, before moving to ETH Zurich in September 2005 as a Full Professor. There, Van de Geer was the first female professor at the Department of Mathematics.

== Research ==
Van de Geer's research is centered around formulating unifying principles for statistical theory and modelling, while identifying theoretical foundations behind existing methods. She typically studies over-parametrized models, but in 2002 she turned her focus to sparsity inducing regularization after deriving entropy-based bounds for regularized estimators. Recently, Van de Geer's work has concentrated on regularization with total variation type norms, the behavior of stationary points of empirical risk functions, inference, and lower bounds. She is currently deriving the generalization error for interpolators and on small noise classification problems.

== Recognition ==
She was an invited speaker at the International Congress of Mathematicians in 2010 and received the Van Wijngaarden Award in 2016. She is a member of the Academy of Sciences Leopoldina and of the International Statistical Institute, a corresponding member of the Royal Netherlands Academy of Arts and Sciences, a Knight in the Order of Orange-Nassau, and a fellow of the Institute of Mathematical Statistics. She became a member of the Academia Europaea in 2020. She was president of the Bernoulli Society for Mathematical Statistics and Probability for the term 2015–2017. In 2018 she was appointed as a member of the Scientific Committee of the Mathematical Research Institute of Oberwolfach. In 2022 she was elected as an international member to the National Academy of Sciences (NAS).

In April 2011, she was a plenary speaker at the 47th Dutch Mathematical Congress in Twente, and a few months later in August 2011 she was a plenary speaker at the ISI satellite meeting "Dynamic Statistical Models" in Copenhagen. In June 2013 she was a plenary speaker at the German-Polish Joint Conference on Probability Theory and Mathematical Statistics and in July 2023 she was the opening lecturer at the 29th European Meeting of Statisticians. In September 2013 Van de Geer was a plenary speaker at Statistische Woche in Berlin and in May 2014 she was an invited speaker at the Abel Symposium 2014.

== Bibliography ==
=== Textbooks and lecture notes ===
- Van de Geer, Sara (2016). Estimation and testing under sparsity : École d'Été de Probabilités de Saint-Flour XLV – 2015. Springer. ISBN 978-3-319-32773-0.
- Bühlmann, Peter; van de Geer, Sara (2011). Statistics for high-dimensional data : methods, theory and applications. Springer. ISBN 978-3-642-20191-2.
- Van de Geer, Sara (2009). Empirical processes in M-estimation. Cambridge University Press. ISBN 978-0-521-12325-9.
- Del Barrio, Eustasio; Deheuvels, Paul; van de Geer, Sara (2007). Lectures on empirical processes : theory and statistical applications. European Mathematical Society. ISBN 978-3-03719-027-2.
- Van de Geer, Sara (2000). Applications of empirical process theory. Cambridge University Press. ISBN 0-521-65002-X.
