= Niels Keiding =

Danish biostatistician (1944–2022)

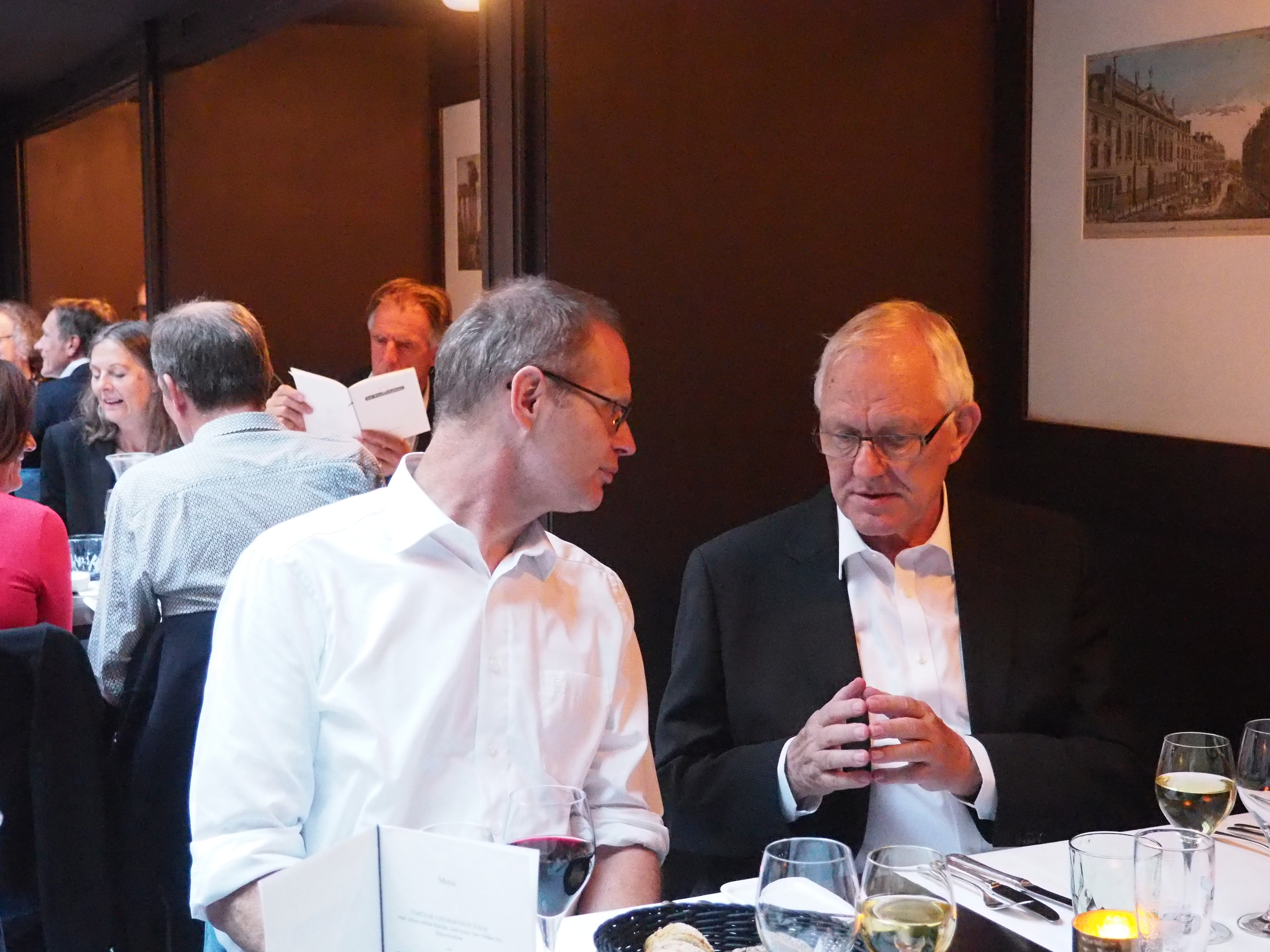
- Niels Keiding (right) in conversation with Arjen Doelman, 2017
- Born: 14 May 1944; Copenhagen
- Died: 3 March 2022 (aged 77)
- Education: University of Copenhagen
- Known for: Biostatistics; Epidemiology
- Scientific career
- Fields: Statistics
- Workplaces: University of Copenhagen

Niels Keiding (14 May 1944 – 3 March 2022) was a Danish biostatistician.

== Biography ==
=== Education ===
Keiding studied at the University of Copenhagen, graduating with a cand.stat. degree (roughly equivalent to a Master's degree in other countries) under supervisor Anders Hald in 1968.

=== Teaching and professional experience ===
At the University of Copenhagen, Keiding successively held assistant, associate and, from 1984, full professor positions, the latter in the section of Biostatistics within the Faculty of Health Sciences. In 1971 he was one of the founders of the Danish Society of Theoretical Statistics (DSTS), serving as its secretary from 1971–1975. The Scandinavian Journal of Statistics was founded in 1974, with DSTS being one of its four societal board members. He was head of the Biostatistics section until three years prior to retirement. In 2014 he became Professor emeritus at the section.

=== Research and development ===
Keiding's research spanned several fields. In demography, he published on nonparametric inference for the Lexis diagram. With coauthors he contributed to event history analysis, including to models where only partial information is available. He applied the latter to time-to-pregnancy (TTP), which is the timespan from the start of when a couple tries to become pregnant until they succeed. In a survey with coauthors, he clarified how survival analysis is used to analyze TTP.

His book, Statistical models based on counting processes, written jointly with Per Kragh Andersen, Ørnulf Borgan, and Richard D. Gill, has been cited extensively in the medical literature and been lauded for its "lucid" exposition of theoretical and practical aspects. Its survey of statistical models based on counting processes has been called "thorough".

Keiding co-authored an influential meta-analysis, known as Carlsen study after the name of the first author, that showed a significant decline in human sperm count and volume from 1938 to 1990.

He also wrote about the history of the use of martingales in survival analysis (with coauthors), and of demography, in particular age-period-cohort analysis in the 19th century.

=== Work for international scientific organisations ===
Keiding served as treasurer of the Bernoulli Society for Mathematical Statistics and Probability (1981–1987), chairman of the board of the Scandinavian Journal of Statistics (1988–1991), and president (1992–1993) of the Biometric Society. He was a member of the Research Section Committee of the Royal Statistical Society (1999–2003), and member of council and several ad hoc committees in the Institute of Mathematical Statistics (IMS) and the International Statistical Institute (ISI). He was president-elect of the ISI in 2003–2005, and president in 2005–2007.

== Selected works ==
=== Books ===
- Kragh Andersen, Per; Borgan, Ørnulf; Gill, Richard D; Keiding, Niels (2012). Statistical models based on counting processes. Springer Science & Business Media. ISBN 978-1-4612-4348-9.

=== Articles ===
- E Carlsen, A Giwercman, N Keiding, NE Skakkebæk, Evidence for decreasing quality of semen during past 50 years. British Medical Journal 305 (6854), 609-613 (1992)
- J Toppari, JC Larsen, P Christiansen, A Giwercman, P Grandjean, et al., Male reproductive health and environmental xenoestrogens. Environmental Health Perspectives 104 (suppl 4), 741-803 (1996)
- WHO Expert Committee on Leprosy: Seventh Report. WHO Expert Committee on Leprosy, World Health Organization (1998)
- PK Andersen, N Keiding, Multi-state models for event history analysis. Statistical Methods in Medical Research 11 (2), 91-115 (2002)

== Honours and awards ==
His honours and awards include:

- 1978 Elected membership of the International Statistical Institute
- 1987 Fellow of Institute of Mathematical Statistics
- 2005 Elected membership as Foreign Member of the Norwegian Academy of Science and Letters
- 2005 Honorary Doctor at University of Bordeaux
- 2008 Honorary Life Member, International Biometric Society
- 2011 Member, Academia Europaea
