= John van de Geer =

Dutch psychologist (1926–2008)

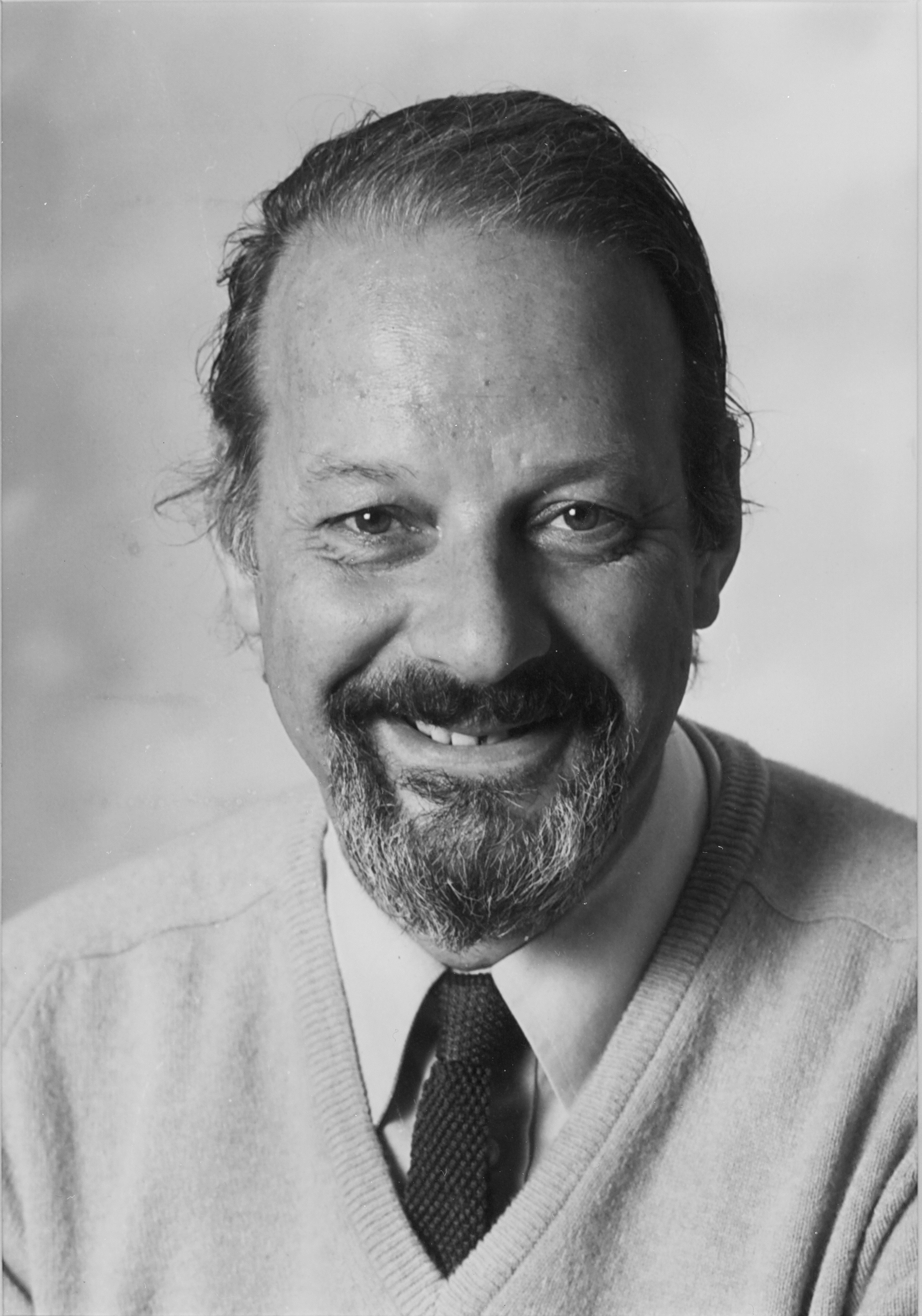
Portrait van de Geer

Johannes Petrus "John" van de Geer (21 June 1926, Rotterdam – 9 February 2008, aged 81) was a Dutch psychologist, and Professor of Experimental Psychology at Leiden University, particularly known for his "Introduction to multivariate analysis for the social sciences".

Van de Geer received his PhD degree at Leiden University in 1957 with a thesis entitled "A Psychological Study of Problem Solving" advised by Alfons Chorus.

Van de Geer was appointed Professor of Experimental Psychology at Leiden University Department of Data Theory in 1961. Among his doctorate students were Willem Levelt (1965), John Michon (1967), Willem Albert Wagenaar (1972), Jan de Leeuw (1973), Willem Heiser (1981) and Jacqueline Meulman (1986). Van de Geer was Visiting Professor at the University of Ankara in 1969. He retired as Professor of "Social Research Methodology, in particular the data theory relating to the social science research" from Leiden University in 1987.

His daughter Sara van de Geer is a statistician.

== Publications ==
Books, a selection:

- 1957. A Psychological Study of Problem Solving Doctoral thesis Leiden University
- 1968. De mening van de psycholoog: Uiteenzettingen over grenzen en mogelijkheden van de huidige psychologie en haar toepassingen. De Toorts.
- 1971. Introduction to multivariate analysis for the social sciences. San Francisco : W. H. Freeman
- 1993. Multivariate Analysis of Categorical Data: Theory. Sage

Articles, a selection:

- Van de Geer, Johan Petrus, Willem JM Levelt, and Reinier Plomp. "The connotation of musical consonance." Acta Psychologica 20 (1962): 308–319.
- Van de Geer, John P., and Joseph MF Jaspars. "Cognitive functions." Annual Review of Psychology 17.1 (1966): 145–176.
- Plomp, R., L. C. W. Pols, and J. P. van de Geer. "Dimensional analysis of vowel spectra." Journal of Acoustical Society of America 41 (1967): 707–712.
- Messick, David M., and John P. van de Geer. "A reversal paradox." Psychological Bulletin 90.3 (1981): 582.
- van de Geer, John P. "Linear relations amongk sets of variables." Psychometrika 49.1 (1984): 79–94.
