= OpenIntro Statistics =

Statistics textbook

- Second edition
- Author: David Diez, Christopher Barr, and Mine Çetinkaya-Rundel
- Subject: Statistics
- Genre: Mathematics

OpenIntro Statistics is an open-source textbook for introductory statistics, written by David Diez, Christopher Barr, and Mine Çetinkaya-Rundel.

The textbook is available online as a free PDF, as LaTeX source and as a royalty-free paperback.
