= Journal of Classification =

- Discipline: Statistics
- Language: English
- Edited by: Paul McNicholas

Publication details
- History: 1984–present
- Publisher: Springer Science+Business Media
- Frequency: 3/year
- Impact factor: 2.0 (2022)

Standard abbreviations
- ISO 4: J. Classif.
- MathSciNet: J. Classification

Indexing
- ISSN: 0176-4268 (print); 1432-1343 (web)

Links
- Journal homepage; Online archive

Journal of Classification is a peer-reviewed academic journal published by Springer Science+Business Media. It is the official journal of The Classification Society. The journal publishes three issues a year on topics in the field of classification, numerical taxonomy, multidimensional scaling and other ordination techniques, cluster analysis, tree structures and other network models. Each issue typically comprises four sections: articles, short notes and comments, software abstracts, and book reviews.

== Editors-in-Chief ==
Since the foundation of the Journal of Classification in 1984, there have been four Editors-in-Chief. The current Editor-in-Chief is Paul McNicholas. The previous Editors-in-Chief were: Douglas L. Steinley (2015–2020); Willem Heiser (2002–2015); and Phipps Arabie (1984–2002).

== Abstracting and indexing ==
Journal of Classification is abstracted and indexed in DBLP, Journal Citation Reports, Mathematical Reviews, Research Papers in Economics, SCImago Journal Rank, Scopus, Science Citation Index, Zentralblatt MATH, among others. According to the Journal Citation Reports, the journal has a 2021 impact factor of 1.333.
