= Aad van der Vaart =

Dutch professor of stochastics (born 1959)

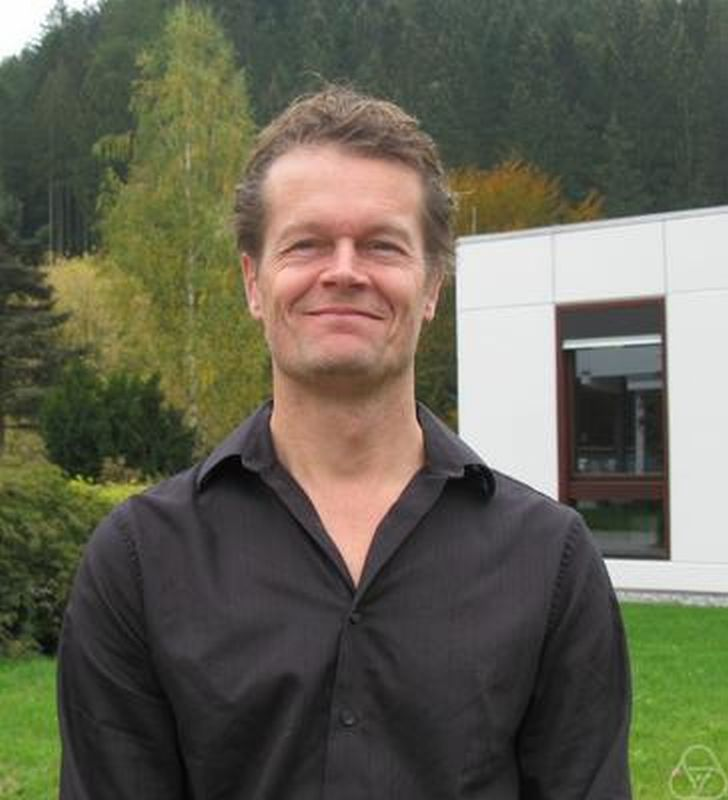
- Born: Adrianus Willem van der Vaart; July 12, 1959 (age 66); Vlaardingen, the Netherlands
- Education: Leiden University
- Scientific career
- Institutions: Vrije Universiteit Amsterdam; Leiden University; Delft University of Technology
- Doctoral advisor: Willem van Zwet

Adrianus Willem "Aad" van der Vaart (born 12 July 1959) is a Dutch professor of Stochastics at the Delft Institute of Applied Mathematics at Delft University of Technology.

== Education and career ==
Van der Vaart was born in Vlaardingen. He went to the Leiden University, where he obtained an MSc degree cum laude in mathematics in 1983. In addition to this, he also obtained a candidate degree in philosophy and psychology. He then subsequently earned his PhD degree in Mathematical statistics at same university in 1987, with a thesis titled: "Statistical estimation in large parameter spaces" under the supervision of Willem van Zwet. He became a professor at the Vrije Universiteit Amsterdam in 1997. He was appointed as professor of Stochastics at Leiden University in 2012. In 2021 he moved to the Technical University of Delft.

== Honours ==
Van der Vaart was elected a member of the Royal Netherlands Academy of Arts and Sciences in 2009. In 2010 he was an Invited Speaker at the International Congress of Mathematicians in Hyderabad, India. He was the recipient of a European Research Council Advanced Grant in 2012. In 2015 he was one of four winners of the Dutch Spinoza Prize and received a 2.5 million euro grant. He was awarded the prize for his research on mathematical models that help track genes for cancer research. On being awarded the prize Van der Vaart stated that 2.5 million euro was too much, claiming he could have 35 postdoctoral and Ph.D. students work with the grant.

In June 2019 Van der Vaart was made a Knight of the Order of the Netherlands Lion.

== Bibliography ==
- van der Vaart, A. W.; Wellner, Jon A. (1996). Weak convergence and empirical processes. New York: Springer. ISBN 0-387-94640-3. OCLC 33664331.
- van der Vaart, A. W. (1998-10-13). Asymptotic Statistics (1 ed.). Cambridge University Press. doi:10.1017/cbo9780511802256. ISBN 978-0-511-80225-6.
- Bolthausen, Erwin; Perkins, Edwin Arend; van der Vaart, A. W. (2002). Bernard, P. (ed.). Lectures on probability theory and statistics : Ecole d'Eté de Probabilités de Saint-Flour XXIX - 1999. Berlin: Springer. ISBN 978-3-540-47944-4. OCLC 50621190.
- Bijma, Fetsje; Jonker, Marianne; van der Vaart, A. W.; Erné, Reinie (2017). Introduction to mathematical statistics. Amsterdam: Amsterdam University Press. ISBN 978-90-485-3611-5. OCLC 999636489.
- Ghosal, Subhashis; van der Vaart, A. W. (2017). Fundamentals of nonparametric Bayesian inference. Cambridge, United Kingdom: Cambridge University Press. ISBN 978-0-521-87826-5. OCLC 965754194.
