= William A. Brock =

American economist (born 1941)

- Born: October 23, 1941 (age 84)

Academic background
- Education: University of California, Berkeley; University of Missouri
- Doctoral advisor: David Gale

Academic work
- Discipline: Mathematical economics
- Institutions: University of Wisconsin–Madison
- Doctoral students: Carlos Manuel Urzúa Macías; Takashi Kamihigashi
- Notable ideas: Brock–Mirman model
- Website: Information at IDEAS / RePEc

William Allen "Buz" Brock (born October 23, 1941) is a mathematical economist and a professor at the University of Wisconsin–Madison since 1975. He is known for his application of a branch of mathematics known as chaos theory to economic theory and econometrics. In 1998, he was elected to the National Academy of Sciences in the Economics Section.

In a 1972 paper, co-authored with Leonard Mirman, Brock provided the first stochastic version of the neoclassical growth model, thereby paving the way for later developments such as real business cycle theory and DSGE models.

== Selected publications ==
=== Selected Papers ===
- Baek, E.G., W.A. Brock (1992). A general test for nonlinear Granger causality: Bivariate Model. Technical Report, Korean Development Institute.
- Barnett, M., W.A. Brock, L.P. Hansen (2020). Pricing uncertainty induced by climate change. Review of Financial Studies, 33, 1024-1066.
- Brock, W.A. (1972). On models of expectations that arise from maximizing behavior of economic agents over time. Journal of Economic Theory, 5, 348-376.
- Brock, W.A. (1974). Money and growth: The case of long run perfect foresight. International Economic Review 15, 750-777.
- Brock, W.A. (1974). Discussion of Roy Radner’s survey paper, in Intriligator, M.D., D.A. Kendrick (eds.), Frontiers of Quantitative Economics, vol. II, 91-92. New York, NY: North Holland Publishing.
- Brock, W.A. (1975). A simple perfect foresight monetary model. Journal of Monetary Economics 1, 133-150.
- Brock, W.A., C.L. Sayers (1988). Is the business cycle characterized by deterministic chaos? Journal of Monetary Economics 22, 71-90.
- Brock, W.A., W.D. Dechert, J.A. Scheinkman, B. LeBaron (1996). A test for independence based on the correlation dimension. Econometric Reviews 15, 197–235.
- Brock, W.A., S.N. Durlauf (2005). Local robustness analysis: Theory and application. Journal of Economic Dynamics and Control 29, 2067-2092.
- Brock, W.A., S.N. Durlauf, J.M. Nason, G. Rondina (2007). Simple versus optimal rules as guides to policy. Journal of Monetary Economics 54, 1372-1396.
- Brock, W.A., S.N. Durlauf, K.D. West (2007). Model uncertainty and policy evaluation: Some theory and empirics. Journal of Econometrics 136, 629-664.
- Brock, W.A., A. Xepapadeas, A.N. Yannacopoulos (2014). Robust control and hot spots in spatiotemporal economic systems. Dynamic Games and Applications 4, 257-289.
- Brock, W.A., A. Xepapadeas, A.N. Yannacopoulos (2014). Optimal agglomerations in dynamic economics. Journal of Mathematical Economics 53, 1-15.
- Brock, W.A., A. Xepapadeas (2021). Regional climate policy under deep uncertainty: Robust control and distributional concerns. Environment and Development Economics 26, 211-238.

=== Books ===
- Brock, W.A. (2001). Growth Theory, Nonlinear Dynamics and Economic Modelling: Scientific Essays of William Allen Brock. Dechert, W.D. (ed.), Cheltenham, UK: Edward Elgar Publishing.
- Malliaris, A.G., W.A. Brock (1988). Stochastic Methods in Economics and Finance. New York, NY: Elsevier North Holland.
