= David van Dantzig =

Dutch mathematician (1900–1959)

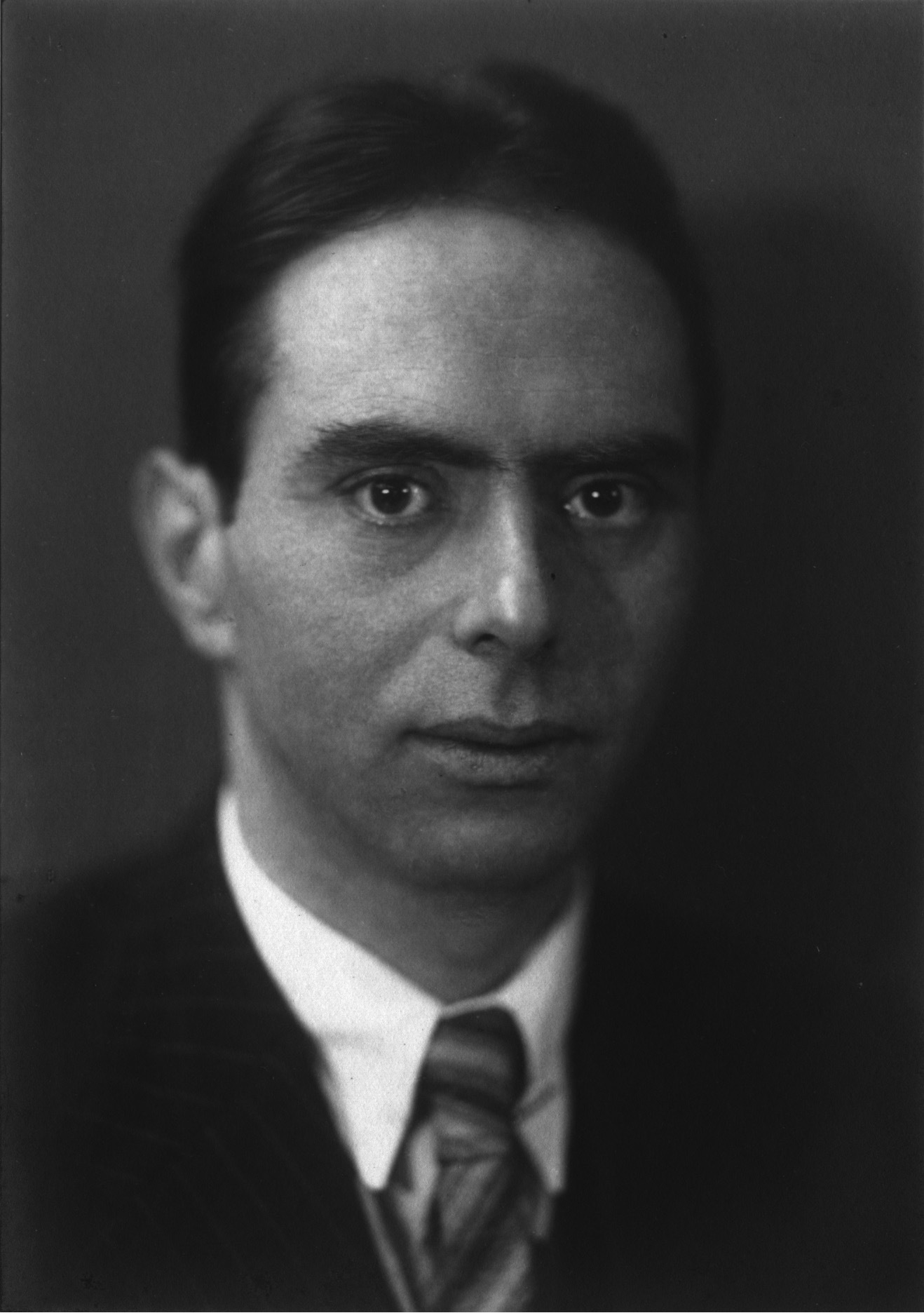
- Born: September 23, 1900; Amsterdam, Netherlands
- Died: July 22, 1959 (aged 58); Amsterdam, Netherlands
- Education: University of Amsterdam
- Scientific career
- Fields: Mathematics
- Workplaces: University of Amsterdam
- Doctoral advisor: Bartel Leendert van der Waerden
- Doctoral students: Constance van Eeden; Jan Hemelrijk; Johan Kemperman

David van Dantzig (September 23, 1900 – July 22, 1959) was a Dutch mathematician, well known for the construction in topology of the solenoid. He was a member of the Significs Group.

== Biography ==
Born to a Jewish family in Amsterdam in 1900, David van Dantzig started to study Chemistry at the University of Amsterdam in 1917, where Gerrit Mannoury lectured. He received his PhD at the University of Groningen in 1931 with a thesis entitled "Studien over topologische algebra" under supervision of Bartel Leendert van der Waerden.

Topological algebra made its first appearance in the paper of Kürschak ..., where the definition of an abstract field with a valuation is clearly set forth. The foundation was completed in the thesis of van Dantzig ...; topological groups, rings, fields, and linear spaces are there defined, and their basic properties are established.

Van Dantzig, in collaboration with Johannes van der Corput and Jurjen Ferdinand Koksma, played a pivotal role in establishing the 'Mathematical Centre' in Amsterdam. This institution, funded by both government and industry, was designed to amalgamate all facets of pure and applied mathematics under a single entity. As the head of the Department of Mathematical Statistics, Van Dantzig was instrumental in enhancing research and fostering consultancy, gaining widespread recognition both nationally and internationally.

He was appointed professor at the Delft University of Technology in 1938, and at the University of Amsterdam in 1946. Among his doctoral students were Jan Hemelrijk (1950), Johan Kemperman (1950), David Johannes Stoker (1955), and Constance van Eeden (1958). In Amsterdam he was one of the founders of the Mathematisch Centrum. At the University of Amsterdam he was succeeded by Jan Hemelrijk.

Originally working on topics in differential geometry and topology, after World War II he focused on probability, emphasizing the applicability to statistical hypothesis testing.

Van Dantzig's contributions to mathematics and statistics were acknowledged through numerous appointments and memberships. In 1949 he became member of the Royal Netherlands Academy of Arts and Sciences (Koninklijke Akademie van Wetenschappen). He was a Fellow of the Institute of Mathematical Statistics, the American Statistical Association, and the Royal Statistical Society. His memberships extended to the International Statistical Institute, and he was a prominent figure in the Dutch Statistical Association (Vereniging voor Statistiek). Additionally, Van Dantzig held the position of Visiting Professor at the University of California, Berkeley in 1951 and spent time working at the National Bureau of Standards in Washington, D.C.

In response to the North Sea flood of 1953, the Dutch Government established the Delta Committee, and asked Van Dantzig to develop a mathematical approach to formulate and solve the economic cost-benefit decision model concerning optimal dike height problems in connection with the Delta Works. The work of the Delta Committee, including the work by Van Dantzig, finally resulted in statutory minimal safety standards. A comprehensive report on this work, spanning several hundred pages, was found on his desk on the day of his death.

== Publications ==
Books, a selection:

- 1931. Studien over topologische algebra. Doctoral thesis University of Groningen.
- 1932. Over de elementen van het wiskundig denken : voordracht. Rede Delft. Groningen : Noordhoff.
- 1938. Vragen en schijnvragen over ruimte en tijd : een toepassing van den wiskundigen denkvorm. Inaugurale rede Technische Hogeschool te Delft
- 1948. De functie der wetenschap : drie voordrachten, met discussie. With E.W. Beth and C.F.P. Stutterheim. 's-Gravenhage : Leopold

Articles, a selection:

- D. van Dantzig, C. Scheffer "On hereditary time discrete stochastic processes, considered as stationary Markov chains, and the corresponding general form of Wald’s fundamental identity," Indag. Math. (16), No.4, (1954), p. 377–388
- Dantzig, D. van. 1956. Economic decision problems for flood prevention. Econometrica 24(3) 276–287.
