= Klaas Sijtsma =

Dutch psychologist

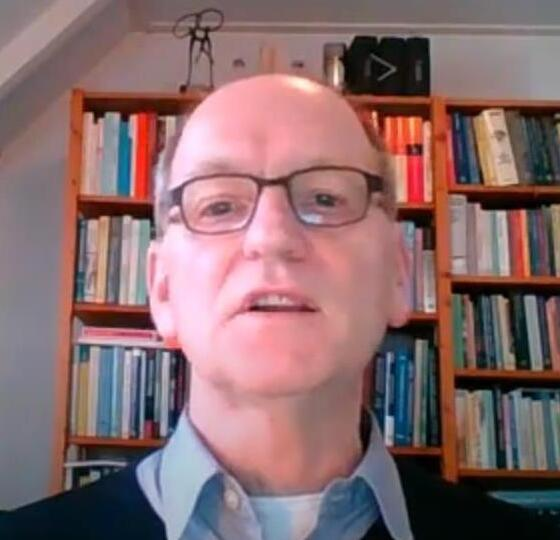
Sijtsma in 2020

Klaas Sijtsma is a Dutch psychologist and applied statistician. He is an emeritus professor at Tilburg University in Netherlands.

== Education and career ==
Sijtsma received his Bachelors and doctorate degrees from the University of Groningen in 1982 and 1988, respectively. His doctoral thesis was supervised by Ivo W. Molenaar. He was a faculty member of University of Groningen, the Vrije Universiteit Amsterdam, Utrecht University. He joined Tilburg University as a faculty member in 1997.

Sijtsma was President of the Psychometric Society (2010-2011), Dean of the Tilburg School of Social and Behavioral Sciences (2011-2017), Rector Magnificus of Tilburg University (2019-2020), and the chair of the Dutch Committee on Tests and Testing or COTAN (2005-2010).

Sijtsma received the Career Award for Lifetime Achievement from the Psychometric Society in 2023.

== Research ==
Sijtsma published more than 200 articles and book chapters on a variety of topics in psychology and psychometrics. He is a co-author of three books on psychometrics including a Dutch-language textbook on test theory (with Pieter Drenth), Introduction to Nonparametric Item Response Theory (with Ivo W Molenaar), Measurement Models for Psychological Attributes (with L. Andries van der Ark), and Never Waste a Good Crisis Lessons Learned from Data Fraud and Questionable Research Practices.

== Books ==
- Sijtsma, Klaas (1988). Contributions to Mokken's nonparametric item response theory. Amsterdam: Free University Press. ISBN 978-90-6256-656-3.
- Sijtsma, K.; Molenaar, Ivo W. (2002). Introduction to nonparametric item response theory. Measurement methods for the social sciences series. Thousand Oaks, Calif: SAGE Publications. ISBN 978-0-7619-0812-8.
- Ark, L. Andries van der; Croon, Marcel A.; Sijtsma, K., eds. (2005). New developments in categorical data analysis for the social and behavioral sciences. Quantitative methodology series. Mahwah, N.J: L. Erlbaum Associates. ISBN 978-0-8058-4728-4.
- Drenth, Pieter J. D.; Sijtsma, K., eds. (2005). Testtheorie: Inleiding in de theorie van de psychologische test en zijn toepassingen. SpringerLink Bücher (Vierde ed.). Houten: Bohn Stafleu van Loghum. ISBN 978-90-313-4747-6.
- Sijtsma, Klaas; Ark, L. Andries van der (2020). Measurement Models for Psychological Attributes. CRC Press. ISBN 978-1-4398-8136-1.
- Sijtsma, Klaas (2023). Never waste a good crisis: lessons learned from data fraud and questionable research practices. ASA-CRC series on statistical reasoning in science & society. Boca Raton: CRC Press. ISBN 978-1-000-88894-2.
