= Johannes Kemperman =

Dutch mathematician

- Born: July 16, 1924; Amsterdam
- Died: June 13, 2011 (aged 86); East Brunswick, New Jersey
- Education: University of Amsterdam
- Scientific career
- Fields: Mathematics; Statistics
- Workplaces: University of Rochester; Purdue University; Rutgers University
- Doctoral advisor: David van Dantzig
- Doctoral students: Edgar Acuna; Leonard Mirman; Martha Siegel

Johannes Henricus Bernardus Kemperman (July 16, 1924 – June 13, 2011) was a Dutch mathematician. He taught at the University of Rochester for 25 years, and also worked at Purdue University and Rutgers University for ten years, each.

Born in Amsterdam, he received his education from the University of Amsterdam.

== Selected publications ==
- Kemperman, J. H. B. (1969). "On the optimum rate of transmitting information". Probability and Information Theory. Lecture Notes in Mathematics. Vol. 89. pp. 126–169. doi:10.1007/BFb0079123. ISBN 978-3-540-04608-0.
- Kemperman, J. H. B. (1963). "A Wiener–Hopf Type Method for a General Random Walk with a Two-Sided Boundary". Annals of Mathematical Statistics. 34 (4): 1168–1193. doi:10.1214/aoms/1177703855. JSTOR 2238330.
- Kemperman, J. H. B. (1960). "On small sumsets in an abelian group". Acta Mathematica. 103 (1–2): 63–88. doi:10.1007/BF02546525.
