= Paul McNicholas (statistician) =

Irish-Canadian statistician

- Born: Paul David McNicholas
- Education: Trinity College Dublin
- Known for: Classification, clustering, mixture models
- Scientific career
- Fields: Statistics
- Workplaces: University of Guelph; McMaster University
- Doctoral advisor: Thomas Brendan Murphy, Myra O'Regan
- Website: www.paulmcnicholas.info

Paul D. McNicholas is an Irish-Canadian statistician. He is a professor and University Scholar in the Department of Mathematics and Statistics at McMaster University. In 2015, McNicholas was awarded the Tier 1 Canada Research Chair in Computational Statistics. McNicholas uses computational statistics techniques, and mixture models in particular, to gain insight into large and complex datasets. He is editor-in-chief of the Journal of Classification.

== Education and career ==
McNicholas attended Trinity College Dublin where in 2004 he received a B.A. (Mod.) in Mathematics. He also holds an M.Sc. in High Performance Computing and a Ph.D. in Statistics. His 2007 Ph.D. thesis is entitled Topics in Unsupervised Learning.

McNicholas started his faculty career at University of Guelph in 2007. In 2014, he joined McMaster University. He has authored more than 100 scientific works cited over 4000 times. The majority of his research has been on model-based clustering, specifically in developing novel finite mixture models for clustering and classification of multivariate data. He has published works on clustering high-dimensional data and the use of non-Gaussian mixtures. McNicholas has published two monographs: Mixture Model-Based Classification and Data Science with Julia.

== Awards ==
- 2026 Fellow, Royal Society of Canada
- 2023 Dorothy Killam Fellowship, Killam Trusts
- 2021 John L. Synge Award, Royal Society of Canada
- 2020 Steacie Prize
- 2019 NSERC E.W.R. Steacie Memorial Fellowship
- 2017 College Member, Royal Society of Canada.
