= Statistica Neerlandica =

- Discipline: Statistics
- Language: English
- Edited by: Veronica Vinciotti, Ernst-Jan Camiel Wit

Publication details
- History: 1946–present
- Publisher: Wiley on behalf of the Netherlands Society for Statistics and Operations Research
- Frequency: Quarterly
- Impact factor: 1.0 (2025)

Standard abbreviations
- ISO 4: Stat. Neerl.

Indexing
- ISSN: 0039-0402 (print); 1467-9574 (web)
- LCCN: 2004233470

Links
- Journal homepage; Online access; Online archive

Statistica Neerlandica is a quarterly peer-reviewed scientific journal published by Wiley on behalf of the Netherlands Society for Statistics and Operations Research. The journal was established in 1946 and covers all areas of statistics. The editors-in-chief are Veronica Vinciotti (University of Trento) and Ernst-Jan Camiel Wit (Università della Svizzera italiana).

== Abstracting and indexing ==
The journal is abstracted and indexed in:

- EBSCO databases
- EconLit
- MathSciNet
- ProQuest
- Science Citation Index Expanded
- Scopus
- zbMATH Open

According to the Journal Citation Reports, the journal has a 2025 impact factor of 1.0.
