= Jan Hemelrijk =

Dutch mathematician (1918–2005)

- Born: 28 May 1918; Arnhem
- Died: 16 March 2005 (aged 86)
- Education: University of Amsterdam
- Scientific career
- Fields: Mathematics
- Workplaces: University of Amsterdam
- Doctoral advisor: David van Dantzig
- Doctoral students: Gijsbert de Leve; Ivo Molenaar; Willem van Zwet

Jan Hemelrijk (28 May 1918 – 16 March 2005) was a Dutch mathematician, Professor of Statistics at the University of Amsterdam, and authority in the field of stochastic processes.

== Biography ==
Hemelrijk received his PhD in 1950 at the University of Amsterdam with a thesis entitled "Symmetry Keys and other applications of the theory of Neyman and Pearson" under supervision of David van Dantzig.

After graduation Hemelrijk started his academic career as assistant to David van Dantzig at the Centrum Wiskunde & Informatica in Amsterdam, and later Head of the Statistical Consulting Department. He was Professor at the Delft University of Technology from 1952 to 1960. In 1960, he was appointed Professor of Statistics at the University of Amsterdam as successor of David van Dantzig. Among his doctoral students were Gijsbert de Leve (1964), Willem van Zwet (1964), R. Doornbos (1966), Ivo Molenaar (1970), Robert Mokken (1970) and J. Dik (1981). Jaap Wessels in 1960 started his academic career Wessels as assistant to Jan Hemelrijk.

Hemelrijk was President of the Netherlands Society for Statistics and Operations Research, and chief editor of the Journal of the association Statistica Neerlandica. He also provided the first television course Statistics of Teleac, broadcast in 1969 and 1970.

In 1963, he was elected as a Fellow of the American Statistical Association.

== Publications ==
- 1950. Symmetry Keys and other applications of the theory of Neyman and Pearson Doctoral thesis University of Amsterdam.
- 1957. Elementaire statistische opgaven met uitgewerkte oplossingen. Gorinchem : Noorduijn
- 1977. Oriënterende cursus mathematische statistiek. Amsterdam : Mathematisch Centrum
- 1998. Statistiek eenvoudig. With Jan Salomon Cramer. Amsterdam : Nieuwezijds

Articles, a selection:

- Hemelrijk, Jan. "In memoriam prof. dr. D van Dantzig (1900-1959)." Statistica Neerlandica 13, 1954, p. 415-432
- Hemelrijk, Jan. "Statistical methods applied to the mixing of solid particles, 1." Stichting Mathematisch Centrum. Statistische Afdeling S 159/54 (1954): 1-16.
- Hemelrijk, Jan. "Het begrip nauwkeurigheid." Stichting Mathematisch Centrum. Statistische Afdeling S 228/58 (1958): 1-19.
