= Willem van Zwet =

Dutch mathematical statistician (1934–2020)

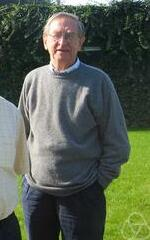
- Born: 31 March 1934; Leiden, Netherlands
- Died: 2 July 2020 (aged 86); Oegstgeest, Netherlands
- Scientific career
- Thesis: Convex Transformations of Random Variables (1964)
- Doctoral advisor: Jan Hemelrijk
- Doctoral students: Ronald Does; Sara van de Geer; Aad van der Vaart

Willem Rutger van Zwet (31 March 1934 – 2 July 2020) was a Dutch mathematical statistician. He was a professor at Leiden University between 1968 and 1999.

== Education and career ==
Van Zwet was born on 31 March 1934 in Leiden. Van Zwet obtained his doctoral degree in 1964 under the supervision of Jan Hemelrijk at the University of Amsterdam with a thesis titled "Convex Transformations of Random Variables". After that, he worked at the Centrum Wiskunde & Informatica in Amsterdam, and became a lector of statistics at Leiden University in 1964 and was named professor in 1968. He retired in 1999.

From 1992 to 1999, Van Zwet was the Director of the Thomas Stieltjes Institute of Mathematics. He co-founded Eurandom in 1997, and served as its director until 2000. From 1997 to 1999, he was also the President of the International Statistical Institute.

== Honors and awards ==
Van Zwet was a Fellow of the Institute of Mathematical Statistics and a member of the Academia Europaea since 1990. He received the Humboldt Prize in 2006. He won the Adolphe Quetelet Medal in 1993, and had been a Fellow of the Royal Statistical Society since 1978. In 1979, he became a member of the Royal Netherlands Academy of Arts and Sciences. In 1996, he was made Knight of the Order of the Netherlands Lion, and was named Doctoris Honoris causa of Charles University the following year. He died on 2 July 2020 in Oegstgeest.
