= Jacqueline Meulman =

Dutch statistician

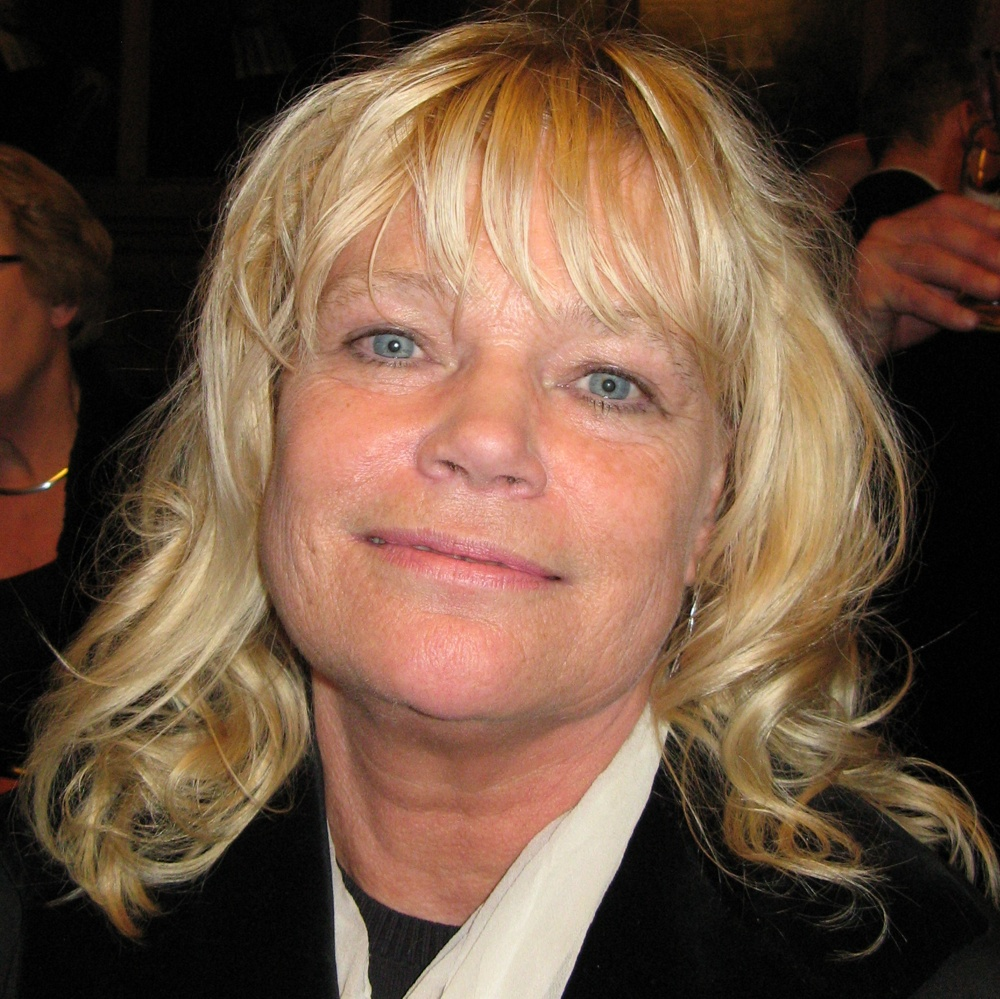
Jacqueline Meulman, 2009

Jacqueline Meulman (born 7 July 1954) is a Dutch statistician and professor emerita of Applied Statistics at the Mathematical Institute of Leiden University.

== Biography ==
Born in The Hague, Meulman received her master's degree in mathematical psychology and data theory at Leiden University in 1981, and obtained her PhD in data theory in 1986 with the thesis entitled "A distance approach to nonlinear multivariate analysis" advised by Jan de Leeuw and John P. van de Geer. She was a consultant for Bell Telephone Laboratories in Murray Hill, NJ, from 1982 to 1983.

In addition to being an associate professor in the Department of Data Theory in Leiden, she was an adjunct professor at the University of Illinois at Urbana–Champaign from 1993 to 1999. In 1998, she was appointed Professor of Applied Data Theory at Leiden University. Since 2009 she is Professor of Applied Statistics at the Mathematical Institute in Leiden. She is currently also an adjunct professor at the Department of Statistics at Stanford University.

Meulman has received several awards, including a five-year "fellowship" of the Royal Netherlands Academy of Arts and Sciences in 1987, de J.C. Ruigrok prijs from the Royal Holland Society of Sciences and Humanities (KHMW) in 1991, a Fulbright Award in 1992, and a PIONEER grant from the Netherlands Organization of Scientific Research (NWO) in 1994. In 2001 she was elected President of the International Psychometric Society, and since 2002 she is a member of the Royal Netherlands Academy of Arts and Sciences (KNAW). From 2011 to 2017 she was president of the Netherlands Society for Statistics and Operations Research. She is an Elected Member of the International Statistical Institute since 1996, and she was elected to the Royal Holland Society of Sciences and Humanities in 2015.

== Work ==
Meulman's research interest are in the field of statistics and data science, and her work includes the development of new statistical methods with applications in the life and behavioral sciences.

Since the 1990s, she manages the development of software in the package CATEGORIES of IBM SPSS Statistics that includes programs for optimal scaling in regularized multiple regression analysis, principal components analysis, correspondence analysis, multidimensional scaling and unfolding. At the Mathematical Institute in Leiden, she was Program Director of the first Dutch Master in Applied Statistics and Data Science in a Faculty of Science. She is also one of the Founding Fathers and co-director of the Leiden Centre of Data Science (LCDS).

== Publications ==
Meulman has authored and co-authored many publications in the field of statistical research and its applications.

Books, a selection:

- 1986. A distance approach to nonlinear multivariate analysis. PhD Thesis, Leiden University: DSWO Press.
- 1990. Albert Gifi Nonlinear Multivariate Analysis (Eds. W.J. Heiser, J.J. Meulman, G. van der Berg). New York: Wiley.
- 2001. Combinatorial Data Analysis: Optimization by Dynamic Programming. With Lawrence Hubert and Phipps Arabie. SIAM Monographs on Discrete Mathematics and Applications. Philadelphia: SIAM.
- 2001. SPSS Categories 11.0 . With Willem J. Heiser. Chicago: SPSS, 2001.
- 2006. The Structural Representation of Proximity Matrices with MATLAB. With Lawrence Hubert and Phipps Arabie. ASA-SIAM Series on Statistics and Applied Probability. Philadelphia: SIAM.

Articles, a selection:

- Meulman, J.J. (1992). The integration of multidimensional scaling and multivariate analysis with optimal transformations. Psychometrika, 57, 539–565.
- Friedman, J.H. and Meulman, J.J. (2003). Prediction with multiple additive regression trees with application in epidemiology. Statistics in Medicine, 22, 1365–1381.
- Meulman, J.J. (2003). Prediction and Classification in Nonlinear Data Analysis: Something old, something new, something borrowed, something blue. Psychometrika, 68, 493–517.
- Friedman, J.H., and Meulman, J.J. (2004). Clustering objects on subsets of attributes (with discussion).Journal of the Royal Statistical Society, Series B (Statistical Methodology), 66, 815–849.
- Meulman, J.J., Van der Kooij,. A.J., and Heiser, W.J. (2004). Principal Components Analysis with Nonlinear Optimal Scaling Transformations for Ordinal and Nominal Data. In: D. Kaplan (ed.), Handbook of Quantitative Methods in the Social Sciences, (pp. 49–70). Newbury Park, CA: Sage Publications.
- Linting, M., Meulman, J.J., Groenen, P. J., and van der Kooij, A. J. (2007). Nonlinear principal components analysis: introduction and application. Psychological methods, 12, 336–358.
- Linting, M., Meulman, J.J., Groenen, P.J., and Van der Kooij, A.J. (2007). Stability of Nonlinear principal components analysis: An empirical study using the balanced bootstrap. Psychological Methods, 12, 359–379.
- Meulman, J.J., Van der Kooij, A.J. and Duisters, K.L.W. (2019). ROS Regression, the integration of regularization and regression with optimal scaling. Statistical Science, 34, 361–390.
