= Daniela Poggiali =

Italian nurse

- Born: 1971–1972 (age 52-53); Italy

Details
- Victims: 38 alleged
- Span of crimes: 2013–2014
- Country: Italy
- Date apprehended: 9 October 2014

Daniela Poggiali is an Italian nurse who was accused of killing 38 of her patients. She was exonerated in 2021, after confounding factors were found in a statistical reanalysis of the hospital's mortality data.

She was arrested after an autopsy on 78-year-old Rosa Calderoni revealed dangerous levels of potassium in her body. 38 of 86 of her patients died within a three-month period.

She was found not guilty by Italy's Supreme Court in January 2023. An account of her case relating it to those of other nurses convicted of killing patients also describes the questions raised by Richard D. Gill about the statistical analyses often used in such cases.
