= Catrien Bijleveld =

Dutch criminologist

Catharina Christina Johanna Hermina "Catrien" Bijleveld (born 1958) is a Dutch criminologist. She is a professor of Research Methods in Criminology at the Vrije Universiteit Amsterdam. Since August 2014 she is director of the Netherlands Institute for the Study of Crime and Law Enforcement.

Bijleveld studied psychology at Leiden University and graduated in 1986. Three years later she obtained her PhD. Bijleveld subsequently worked for TNO as a statistical consultant. She then worked as lecturer at Leiden University. In 1997 she was employed as programme director at the Research and Documentation Centre of the Dutch Ministry of Justice. In 2002 Bijleveld obtained a further law degree at Leiden University. From 2001 to 2014 she was a senior researcher at the Netherlands Institute for the Study of Crime and Law Enforcement.

Bijleveld was elected a member of the Royal Netherlands Academy of Arts and Sciences in 2010. She is a member of a state commission investigating violence in Dutch from child protection services between 1945 and the present.
