= Netherlands Society for Statistics and Operations Research =

- Formation: 1945
- Legal status: Society
- Purpose: to promote the study and the correct application of statistics and operations research and closely related parts of mathematics, in order to serve science and society
- Region served: Netherlands
- Parent organization: Association of European Operational Research Societies International Federation of Operational Research Societies
- Website: www.ngb-online.nl

The Netherlands Society for Statistics and Operations Research (in Dutch Vereniging voor Statistiek en Operationele Research (VVS+OR)) is a Dutch professional association for Statistics and Operations Research. The society is a member of the umbrella organizations Federation of European National Statistical Societies (FENStatS), the Association of European Operational Research Societies (EURO), and of the International Federation of Operational Research Societies (IFORS).

It was founded on August 15, 1945 as "Vereniging voor Statistiek". It aims to promote the study and the correct application of statistics and operations research and closely related parts of mathematics, in order to serve science and society.

The association publishes a scientific journal, Statistica Neerlandica, as well as a magazine, STAtOR, and organizes conferences and other meetings in various fields of statistics and operations research. The society consists of nine sections, devoting to various fields of statistical science. These sections are on Biometrics, Data Science, Economics, Mathematical Statistics, Operations Research, Social Sciences, Statistics Communication, Statistics Education and one for Young Statisticians.

The president of the Society is Casper Albers. Among the previous presidents were Jaap Wessels (1993 - 1997) and Richard D. Gill (2007 - 2011), and Jacqueline J. Meulman(2011-2016).

== Magazines ==
The association publishes the magazines "Statistica Neerlandica" and since 2000 "STAtOR". The latter replaced the Gazette "VVS-Bulletin" which was last published in 1999.
