= Niemand =

Niemand is the German, Dutch and Afrikaans word for "nobody". It may also refer to:

- Jason Niemand, South African cricketer
- James Phillips (South African musician), South African rock singer known under the pseudonym "Bernoldus Niemand"
- "Niemand", a B-side single by German industrial metal band Oomph! from their album Ego
- "Niemand", B-side of Connie Francis' German single "Wenn ich träume"

== See also ==
- Niemand hört dich
- Niemand sonst
- Niemand heeft nog tijd
- Keine Macht für Niemand
- Niemandsland
- Niemandsland and Beyond
- Niemandsvriend
- Nieman (surname)
- Niemann, a surname
- Nimanda Madushanka
- Nirmand
