= Nyoman =

Nyoman is an Indonesian name. It may refer to:

- I Gusti Nyoman Lempad
- I Nyoman Ansanay
- I Nyoman Giri Prasta
- I Nyoman Ngendon
- I Nyoman Rembang
- I Nyoman Sudarma
- I Nyoman Sukarja
- I Nyoman Windha
- Ida Bagus Nyoman Rai
- Nyoman Masriadi
- Nyoman Nuarta
- Nyoman Oka Antara
- Nyoman Rudana
- Nyoman Tusthi Eddy
- Ponsianus Nyoman Indrawan

== See also ==
- Nyoman (magazine), a Belarusian literary magazine
- Neman (disambiguation)
