= Neeman =

Neeman may refer to:

- Cal Neeman (1929–2015), retired professional baseball player who played catcher in the Major Leagues from 1957 to 1963
- Herzog, Fox & Ne'eman, the largest law firm in Israel
- Amnon Neeman (born 1957), Australian mathematician
- Itay Neeman (born 1972), Israeli-American mathematician
- Neeman Committee, established to solve disputes concerning the process of Conversion to Judaism within the borders of Israel
- Yaakov Neeman (1939–2017), Israeli lawyer and the current Minister of Justice
- Yael Neeman (born 1960), Israeli author

== See also ==
- Ne'eman (disambiguation)
- Neman (disambiguation)
