= Nieman (surname) =

Nieman is a Dutch and Low German surname that originated as a nickname for either an unknown or nameless person (Niemand in Dutch and German) or a newcomer to a place (modern Dutch nieuw man, cognate to English Newman and High German Neumann) People with this surname include:

- Alfred Nieman (1914–1997), British pianist and composer
- Andries Nieman (1927–2009), South African boxer
- Bob Nieman (1927–1985), American baseball player and scout
- Butch Nieman (1918–1993), American baseball player
- Charles Nieman (born 1949), American megachurch preacher
- Lucius W. Nieman (1857–1935), American journalist
- Marnus T. Nieman (2004-Present) Software developer
- Randall Nieman, American musician
- Robert Nieman (born 1947), American modern pentathlete
- Sebilla Alida Johanna Niemans (1927–1959), Dutch murder victim known as Blonde Dolly

== See also ==
- Neeman (disambiguation)
- Neman (disambiguation)
- Niemen (disambiguation)
- Niemand
