= Edwin Leuven =

Dutch economist

Edwin Leuven is a Dutch economist and Professor of Economics at the University of Oslo. He is one of the leading European education economists, with a focus on the economics of training.

== Biography ==
A native of the Netherlands, Edwin Leuven obtained a M.A. in econometrics and a Ph.D. in economics from the University of Amsterdam in 1994 and 2001, respectively. During his studies, Leuven worked as consultant for the OECD, where he performed research on e.g. the financing of lifelong learning. After his Ph.D., Leuven continued working at the University of Amsterdam, first as associate professor (1997-2004) and later as associate professor (2005–08). In 2008, he then took up a full professorship at the École Nationale de la Statistique et de l'Administration Économique (ENSAE) in Paris before moving on to the University of Oslo, where he has been Professor of Economics since 2011. Leuven is affiliated with the IZA Institute of Labor Economics, CEPR and the Research Department of Statistics Norway and has had affiliations with the Tinbergen Institute and CREST in the past. Moreover, he works as (associate) editor for the Journal of Political Economy and Annals of Economics and Statistics and used to (co-)edit the journals Labour Economics and Economics of Education Review. Finally, he has been an active member of the European Association of Labour Economists (EALE), serving on its executive committee in 2013–15, and works as an expert in the EU-financed European Network on the Economics of Education.

== Research ==
Edwin Leuven's research interests include applied econometric, especially in relation with education and the labour market. He ranks among the top 2% of economists listed on IDEAS/RePEc in terms of research output. In his research, Leuven has been a frequent collaborator of Hessel Oosterbeek, with whom he worked at the University of Amsterdam.

A key topic in Leuven's research is workplace training. Comparing the demand and supply of training in Canada, Switzerland, the Netherlands and the US, Leuven and Ooosterbeek find that the employer is typically the provider of training and often willing to pay for general training, that international differences in training largely reflect differences in the weights of certain worker and job characteristics, and that the demand for training tends to increase in workers' education and training. Analysing the impact of legislation enabling Dutch firms to claim a larger share of their expenditures on employees' training if they are aged 40 or older, they find that the training rate of workers just above the age of 40 is 15–20% higher than that of workers just below 40, with the effect mainly reflecting the postponement of earlier training needs and having no significant effect on workers' wages. However, using an estimation method in which they narrow down the comparison group to workers who wanted private-sector training but were unable to participate because of random events, Oosterbeek and Leuven observe only much smaller, statistically insignificant returns to training. Important surveys by Leuven in this field review the literatures on workplace training in Europe and the economics of private sector training, the latter with a focus on strategic interaction between employers and employees and market imperfections.

Another field of research for Leuven have been the determinants of student achievement. Together with Mikael Lindahl, Hessel Oosterbeek and Dinand Webbink, he finds that extra funding for personnel or computers and software targeted at primary schools with large populations of disadvantaged students significantly decrease student achievement, with extra funding for IT being particularly detrimental for girls. In another study, Leuven, Oosterbeek and Bas van der Klaauw investigate the effect of financial rewards on student achievement, finding that the offer of financial rewards for Dutch university freshmen who pass all required first-year subjects increases only the achievement of high-ability students while decreasing that of low-ability students, with the effects worsening over time, possibly due to the erosion of intrinsic motivation by the extrinsic reward.

Finally, Leuven has also conducted on wage differentials and overeducation. With regard to wage differentials, in addition to Leuven & Oosterbeek (2008), he observes in work with Oosterbeek and Hans van Ophem, that about one third of the variation in wage differentials between skill groups in developed economies are explained by differences in the net supply of skill groups, with relative demand and supply being a particularly strong determinant of relative wages of low-skilled workers In another study (with Lars Kirkeboen and Magne Mogstad), Leuven examines the wage differentials of different types of postsecondary education, including the field and institution of study, in Norway, and finds that different fields of study have substantially different labour market payoffs, even when institutions and peer quality are controlled for, that attending a more selective institution within a given field doesn't improve earnings by much, and that individuals' selection of fields suggest that they choose fields in which they have comparative advantages. With regard to overeducation, Leuven's research is reviewed in his and Oosterbeek's synthesis of those economic literatures in the Handbook of the Economics of Education.
