= Mirjam van Praag =

Dutch university teacher and econometrist (born 1967)

Mirjam Van Praag
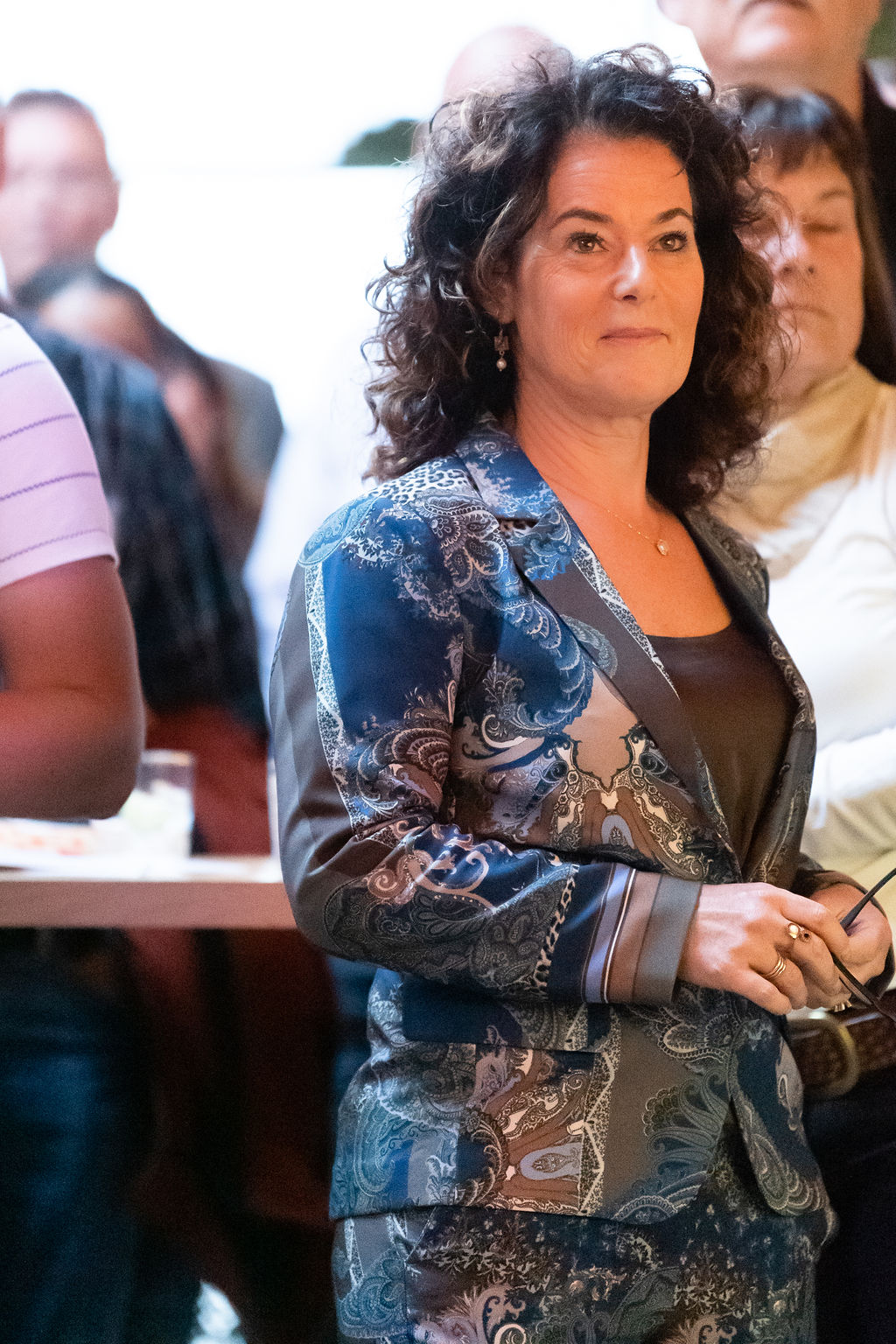
- Mirjam van Praag in 2019

President of Vrije Universiteit Amsterdam

Personal details
- Born: 11 November 1967 (age 58) Schiedam
- Occupation: Academic

Céline Mirjam van Praag (Schiedam, 11 November 1967) is a Dutch university educator and econometrist. She is the Chair of the government's Advisory Council for Science Technology and Innovation (AWTI). She is also a professor of Entrepreneurship and Leadership at Vrije Universiteit Amsterdam (VU) and a member of the Royal Netherlands Academy of Arts and Sciences (KNAW).

== Biography ==
Céline Mirjam van Praag served as chair of the Executive Board of VU Amsterdam from March 2018 to September 2023. Previously, she was a professor of Entrepreneurship at Copenhagen Business School, where she was the first to hold the Maersk McKinney Moller chair, and professor of Entrepreneurship and Organization at the University of Amsterdam where she founded and led the Amsterdam Center for Entrepreneurship (ACE) and was a crown member of the Social and Economic Council (SER).

== Youth and education ==
Mirjam van Praag is the younger daughter of the econometrician Bernard van Praag and Loes van Wezel, and a granddaughter of the hispanist J.A. van Praag. Her parents are from Jewish families and went into hiding during World War II. She grew up with her older sister near Rotterdam and graduated from the Gymnasium Beta at Scholengemeenschap de Krimpenerwaard in 1986. From the ages of 15 to 21, she was a member of the Jewish youth association Haboniem-Dror.

Van Praag graduated cum laude in econometrics from the University of Amsterdam (UvA) in 1991. During her studies, she was a member of the student association SSRA. She worked as a student assistant at SEO Economic Research while studying.

From September 1992 to the end of 1995, she worked on her PhD research while teaching microeconomics at the Faculty of Economics and Business at UvA. Her PhD supervisors were Prof J.S. (Mars) Cramer and Prof J. (Joop) Hartog. Simultaneously, she worked at Intomart GfK as a junior new business developer and advisor. During her doctoral research, she lived in Israel for half a year and worked at Tel Aviv University. She obtained her PhD cum laude from the University of Amsterdam in 1996 in economic sciences. The title of her dissertation was Determinants of Successful Entrepreneurship and was later published by Edward Elgar Publishing.

== Career ==
Prior to her PhD journey at UvA, Van Praag worked as a financial analyst at Procter & Gamble (1991-1992). After her PhD, she worked for three years at the Boston Consulting Group, returning to academia at the end of 1998 as Associate Professor of Organization Economics at the University of Amsterdam. From this role, the bachelor’s and master’s programs in 'Organization Economics' emerged. In 2005, Van Praag was appointed as a professor of "Entrepreneurship & Organization" at UvA and founded the Amsterdam Center for Entrepreneurship (ACE), which has grown into a large Amsterdam collaboration bridging academia with Dutch businesses, policymakers, and (student) entrepreneurs.The minors in entrepreneurship at the Amsterdam knowledge institutions have emerged from this, as well as the joint Master's in Entrepreneurship from the University of Amsterdam (UvA) and VU University Amsterdam (VU).

In early 2014, Van Praag was appointed the first professor on the Mærsk Mc-Kinney Møller endowed chair at Copenhagen Business School. In March 2018, she returned to Amsterdam as Chair of the Executive Board of Vrije Universiteit Amsterdam, succeeding Jaap Winter. At her farewell after 5.5 years as chair in September 2023, she received the Frans Banning Cocq Medal from Mayor Femke Halsema for her contributions to the university and entrepreneurship in the city. Margrethe Jonkman followed Van Praag as chair of VU Amsterdam.

Since September 2023, Van Praag has been a professor of Entrepreneurship & Leadership at VU Amsterdam. In March 2025, she started combining this chair with the chairmanship of the Advisory Council for Science Technology and Innovation (AWTI), succeeding Eppo Bruins, who has been appointed Minister of Education, Culture and Science in the Schoof cabinet.

== Additional activities ==
Van Praag is a supervisor/commissioner at Accenture B.V. since the beginning of 2026. In 2021, she succeeded Alexander Rinnooy Kan as chair of the Supervisory Board of Debate and Cultural Center De Balie. She is also vice-chair of the Supervisory Board of the Anne Frank Foundation (2019-); a board member of the American European Community Association in The Netherlands (2021-); chair of the board of governors of the Professor De Vries Foundation (2024-), as successor to Hans Schenk; a commissioner of BiotechBooster (2024-), and a member of advisory councils like De Nationale Denktank (2025-) and Everyday Heroes (2020-).

In the past, Van Praag has held various additional positions, such as being a crown member of the Social and Economic Council (2010-2018), chair of the Amsterdam Academic Club (2010-2013), and a commissioner of organizations like Algemene Pensioen Groep (2006-2013), De Nederlandsche Bank (2020-2026) and Berlingske Media part of DPG Media (2014-2019).

== Research ==
Mirjam van Praag is a prominent researcher into the economic role and significance of entrepreneurship. She uses advanced econometric models to study the motivations and success factors of entrepreneurs. Additionally, she conducts research using (field) experiments to investigate the impact of different interventions on entrepreneurs' behavior. Her publications emphasize the importance of education for successful entrepreneurship and demonstrate that teams with a balanced composition perform better than those with a one-sided makeup. Van Praag's more recent work has provided important insights into the dynamics of entrepreneurship and leadership, as well as the differences in attitudes and behavior between entrepreneurs and managers/executives.

Van Praag's research topics in the field of entrepreneurship include:

1. Success and Failure: Research on the factors contributing to the success and failure of entrepreneurs, such as the role of education, skills, experience, and intelligence. Her work has contributed to a better understanding of what makes entrepreneurs successful and how entrepreneurship can be promoted. Her main co-authors in this area are Gary Duschnitsky, Joop Hartog, Simon Parker, Justin van der Sluis, and Diego Zunino.
2. Motivation, Incentives, and Behavior of Entrepreneurs (vs Managers): Using experiments and models, Van Praag investigates the behavioral attitude of entrepreneurs (compared to managers, for example). Entrepreneurs are often more likely to take risks and rely more on intuition and heuristics. She also examines what motivates people to pursue entrepreneurship. Her key co-authors in this area include Mars Cramer, Laura Rosendahl Huber, Martin Koudstaal, Simon Parker, Randolph Sloof, and Theo Vladasel.
3. Leadership, Teams, Diversity, and Role Models: In several (field) experiments, Van Praag has demonstrated that various aspects of diversity in entrepreneurial teams improve the performance of those teams. Her key co-authors on this theme are Sander Hoogendoorn, Laura Rosendahl Huber, Hessel Oosterbeek, Simon Parker, Vera Rocha, Randolph Sloof, and Theo Vladasel.
4. Nature, Nurture, Education, and Entrepreneurship: Van Praag shows that entrepreneurship is more about "nurture" than "nature"; that the value of education for entrepreneurs is substantial, but that specific entrepreneurship programs often do not achieve the desired effect. Well-designed educational programs, however, can develop essential entrepreneurial skills. Her key collaborators include Laura Rosendahl Huber, Matthew Lindquist, Hessel Oosterbeek, Simon Parker, Randolph Sloof, Justin van der Sluis, Joeri Sol, and Theo Vladasel.
5. Impact of Entrepreneurship: Her research highlights the economic and social importance of entrepreneurship, often through innovation. Co-authors in this domain include Joern Block, Christian Fisch, Jose Millan, Conception Roman, Andre van Stel, and Peter Versloot.

Van Praag’s work is widely published and has been cited extensively. Her academic research has contributed to discussions on entrepreneurship and has been recognized as infulencing the entrepreneurial climate in the Netherlands.

== Key publications ==
- Zunino, Diego; Dushnitsky, Gary; van Praag, Mirjam (August 2022). "How Do Investors Evaluate Past Entrepreneurial Failure? Unpacking Failure Due to Lack of Skill versus Bad Luck". Academy of Management Journal. 65 (4): 1083–1109. doi:10.5465/amj.2018.0579. hdl:10398/00e6fb3d-6897-4e89-a90c-3231616e3a7c.
- Rocha, Vera; van Praag, Mirjam (May 2020). "Mind the gap: The role of gender in entrepreneurial career choice and social influence by founders". Strategic Management Journal. 41 (5): 841–866. doi:10.1002/smj.3135. hdl:10398/f209ead8-e851-4969-8343-8ff7fafb3631.
- Hoogendoorn, Sander; Parker, Simon C.; van Praag, Mirjam (December 2017). "Smart or Diverse Start-up Teams? Evidence from a Field Experiment". Organization Science. 28 (6): 1010–1028. doi:10.1287/orsc.2017.1158.
- Koudstaal, Martin; Sloof, Randolph; van Praag, Mirjam (September 2016). "Risk, Uncertainty, and Entrepreneurship: Evidence from a Lab-in-the-Field Experiment" (PDF). Management Science. 62 (10): 2897–2915. doi:10.1287/mnsc.2015.2249.
- Lindquist, Matthew J.; Sol, Joeri; Van Praag, Mirjam (2015). "Why Do Entrepreneurial Parents Have Entrepreneurial Children?" (PDF). Journal of Labor Economics. 33 (2): 269–296. doi:10.1086/678493. hdl:11245/1.395582. JSTOR 10.1086/678493. SSRN 2101543.
- Huber, Laura Rosendahl; Sloof, Randolph; Van Praag, Mirjam (November 2014). "The effect of early entrepreneurship education: Evidence from a field experiment". European Economic Review. 72: 76–97. doi:10.1016/j.euroecorev.2014.09.002.
- Hoogendoorn, Sander; Oosterbeek, Hessel; van Praag, Mirjam (July 2013). "The Impact of Gender Diversity on the Performance of Business Teams: Evidence from a Field Experiment" (PDF). Management Science. 59 (7): 1514–1528. doi:10.1287/mnsc.1120.1674.

== Memberships and awards ==
In 2023, Van Praag received the Frans Banning Cocq Medal from Mayor Femke Halsema upon her departure as chair of the Board of Governors of Vrije Universiteit Amsterdam, in recognition of her contributions to the university and entrepreneurship in the city. In 2020, she was elected a member of the Royal Netherlands Academy of Arts and Sciences (KNAW).

Additionally, Van Praag has been a member of the Royal Holland Society of Sciences and Humanities (KHMW) since 2010, a fellow of the Centre for Economic Policy Research (CEPR) since 2016, and a fellow of the Tinbergen Institute since 2002. She serves as an "Editorial (advisory) Board Member" for several academic journals in her field.

== Personal life ==
Mirjam van Praag lives in Amsterdam and has a partner. Her two adult children, Sarah (1998) and Boaz (1999), also live in Amsterdam.
