= Naaldwijk, Sliedrecht =

Defunct Dutch municipality

Coordinates: 51.993°N 4.206°E

Naaldwijk is a former municipality in the Dutch province of South Holland.

The municipality only existed from April 1, 1817, to August 23, 1818. Before and after that time, the area was part of Sliedrecht.

According to the 19th-century historian A.J. van der Aa, Naaldwijk used to be a separate manor to the east of Sliedrecht, but had already been unified with Sliedrecht for so long, that the boundaries of the manor were no longer known.
