= Joop Hartog =

Dutch economist (born 1946)

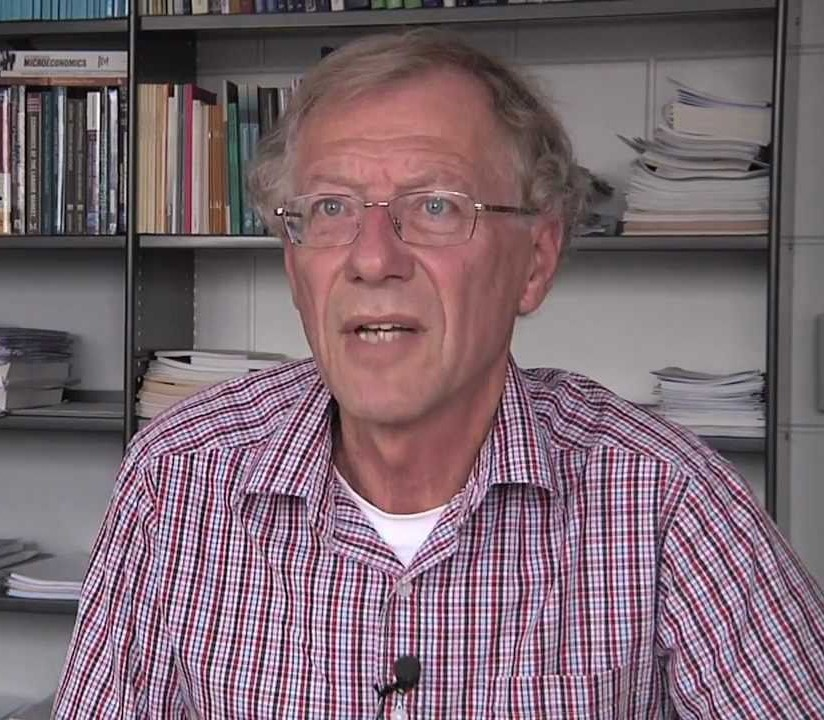
- Born: June 29, 1946 (age 80); Sliedrecht, Netherlands

Academic background
- Education: Erasmus University Rotterdam

"Joop" (Joost) Hartog (born June 29, 1946, in Sliedrecht, the Netherlands) is a Dutch economist and an Emeritus Professor of Economics at the University of Amsterdam. He ranks among the most important Dutch labour economists and was elected to be a member of the Royal Netherlands Academy of Arts and Sciences (2001) and the Royal Holland Society of Sciences and Humanities. The Joop Hartog Dissertation Prize, a bi-annual prize for the best Ph.D. thesis defended at the University of Amsterdam's Faculty of Economics and Business, is named after Hartog.

== Biography ==
A native of Sliedrecht, Joop Hartog studied at the Netherlands School of Economics (1964–70) and at Queen's University, Kingston, where he earned a M.A. in 1971. Thereafter, Hartog did a Ph.D. at the Erasmus University Rotterdam (EUR) under the supervision of C.J. van Eijk on the topic of personal income distribution, which he defended in 1978. After working several years at EUR, he became Professor of Microeconomics at the University of Amsterdam in 1981 and worked there until his emeritation. In parallel to his appointment in Amsterdam, Hartog has held numerous visiting appointments, e.g. as Fulbright Scholar at Stanford University, as Wertheim Fellow at Harvard University, or as visiting fellow at the European University Institute. Hartog helped found Labour Economics and has performed editorial duties for the European Economic Review, Economics of Education Review, and the Journal of Pay and Reward Management. Finally, he is also on the board of several boards and advisory councils, including the Dutch Council of Economic Advisors and the Hennipman Foundation.

== Research ==
Joop Hartog's research focuses on education, wages, and migration. According to IDEAS/RePEc, Hartog belongs to the top 4% of economists in terms of research output.

=== Research on education ===
With regard to the economics of education, Joop Hartog has conducted research on overeducation and the returns to education, among else. Together with Hessel Oosterbeek, he finds that due to more higher education enrollment, undereducation in the Netherlands decreased throughout the 1960s and 1970s while overeducation increased, though the rate of return to education is positive even in cases of "overeducation", implying that overeducation doesn't necessarily imply private or social inefficiency. However, comparing the stylized facts of over- and undereducation in the U.S., Netherlands, UK, Portugal and Spain with models of search theory, human capital theory, and assignment, Hartog concludes that none of the models convincingly explains the earnings function associated with over- and undereducation. Together with Oosterbeek, he observes health, wealth or happiness among Dutch not to increase linearly in education: individuals with only a non-vocational secondary school degree are generally healthier, wealthier and happier than TVET or university graduates; moreover, they find IQ to increase health, social background to increase wealth, and being a woman to increase happiness. Finally, in work with Pedro T. Pereira and Jose A.C. Vieira, he finds returns to education in Portugal to have increased during the 1980s and early 1990s, especially since its accession to the European Union in 1986, though the returns to education grew most at the upper part of the wage distribution, thus also explaining part of the increase in Portuguese wage inequality in the 1980s.

=== Research on wages and entrepreneurship ===
With regard to wages, Hartog and Oosterbeek observe that, in the early 1990s, the earnings prospects of Dutch public sector workers were better in the public sector than in the private sector and vice versa, pointing to comparative advantages among workers. Together with Coen Teulings, Hartog has leveraged his research on wage behaviour to develop a theory why non-competitive wage differentials are smaller in a corporatist system than in a decentralized system, arguing that corporatist institutions provide a solutions to the hold-up problem of investments by specifying ex ante contracts that remove the need for labour market parties to bargain ex post over the use of the employment relationship's economic surplus. More recently, Hartog has also conducted research on the nexus between entrepreneurship, earnings, risks and skills. In research with Ada Ferrer-i-Carbonell and Nicole Jonker, Hartog finds that Arrow-Pratt measures of risk aversion decrease in income and wealth, are higher for employees than for entrepreneurs, lower for private sector employees than for civil servants as well as for men than for women. In further work with Jonker, J.S. Cramer and Mirjam van Praag, he moreover finds evidence that individuals with low risk aversion are more likely to be or become entrepreneurs. Finally, in an influential study with van Praag and Justin van Sluis, Hartog observes that general ability has a stronger impact on entrepreneurial income than on wages, that mathematical, social and technical abilities are more valuable for entrepreneurs, whereas employees benefit more from verbal and clerical abilities, and that having a skill set balanced across these various kinds of abilities benefits only entrepreneurs, a finding in line with Edward Lazear's "Jack-of-all-trades" theory of entrepreneurship.
