= Niermann =

Niermann is a German surname. Notable people with the surname include:

- Georg Niermann (born 1937), West German rower
- Grischa Niermann (born 1975), German road bicycle racer
- Ingo Niermann (born 1969), German novelist, writer, and artist

== See also ==
- Niemann
