= Destination Anywhere =

Destination Anywhere may refer to:

- Destination Anywhere (Jon Bon Jovi album), 1997, or the title track
- Destination Anywhere (film), a film inspired by the above album
- Destination Anywhere (band), a German ska punk/pop punk band
- Destination Anywhere (Brenda Kahn album), 1996
- Destination: Anywhere, a 1968 song by The Marvelettes
