= Vratićeš se Satane =

Studio album by Klopka Za Pionira
- Released: 2005
- Recorded: 2005
- Genre: Noise-rock
- Length: 40:21
- Label: Ne-ton
- Producer: Damjan Brkić

Klopka Za Pionira chronology
Haker ili iskušavanje Đavola (2004)	Vratićeš se Satane (2005)	Jutro u fabrici EP (2007)

Vratićeš se Satane is the third album by the Serbian noise-rock band Klopka Za Pionira, released in 2005 (see 2005 in music) on the Ne-ton independent label. It consists of ten songs, cover versions of tracks by Satan Panonski, which is unusual for Klopka. It is also unusual for Mileta to sing lyrics that are not his own. The cover art was by Bouraiqc des Merdes.

== Track listing ==
All lyrics by Ivica Čuljak and music by Klopka Za Pionira

1. "To sam ja" – 2:50
2. "Kamikaza" – 4:24
3. "Mario" – 4:42
4. "Oči u magli" – 2:50
5. "Pioniri maleni" – 3:25
6. "Advokat" – 5:23
7. "Euro" – 2:28
8. "Oči u magli" – 4:16
9. "Misli li istok..." – 3:32
10. "Vratićeš se Satane" – 6:17 (This song is listed on the back cover under letter A instead of number 10, probably indicating that it is a bonus track.)

== Personnel ==
- Mileta Mijatović - vocals
- Damjan Brkić - guitar, drum machine
- Vladimir Lenhart - bass guitar, tapes
