= Niemen (disambiguation) =

Niemen may refer to:

- Neman river
- Czesław Niemen, Polish musician
- Niemen (album)
- HMS Niemen
  - HMS Niemen (1809)
- Grupa Niemen (Niemen Group), a former name of SBB (band), Poland

== See also ==
- Nieman (disambiguation)
- Neman (disambiguation)
