= Neman (disambiguation) =

The Neman is a European river that rises in Belarus and flows through Lithuania.

Neman may also refer to:

- Neman culture
- FC Neman Grodno, a soccer club in Belarus
- FC Neman Mosty, a soccer club in Belarus
- HK Neman Grodno, an ice hockey club in Belarus
- Neman Stadium, a stadium in Belarus
- Neman R-10, a Soviet aircraft of the 1930s
- Neman (bus manufacturer), a bus manufacturer in Belarus
- Neman (album)
- Nyoman (magazine), a Belarusian literary magazine

== Places ==
- Neman, Russia, a town in Kaliningrad Oblast, Russia

== See also ==
- Nieman (surname)
- Niemen (disambiguation)
- Nyoman
