= Raj na Zemlji postoji =

Studio album by Klopka Za Pionira
- Released: 2004
- Recorded: 2004
- Genre: Noise-rock, punk
- Length: 38:28
- Label: Ne-ton
- Producer: Damjan Brkić

Klopka Za Pionira chronology
| Raj na Zemlji postoji (2004) | Haker ili iskušavanje đavola (2004) |

Raj na Zemlji postoji is the first album by the Serbian noise-rock band Klopka Za Pionira, released in 2004 (see 2004 in music) on the Ne-ton independent label. The album is characterized by fast tempo punk-like songs with only clues to the band's future sound.

== Track listing ==
All music by Klopka Za Pionira

1. "Šuma šuma" – 3:48
2. "Matematika (osnovno obrazovanje)" – 3:01
3. "Matematika (srednje obrazovanje)" – 3:42
4. "Matematika (visoko obrazovanje)" – 0:51
5. "Ne, gospodine" – 3:03
6. "Da li hoćeš da ti pevam" – 1:21
7. "Polomi mu kosti, sačuvaj moral" – 1:21
8. "Šta će novo kada ima staro" – 2:11
9. "Mesija" – 3:48
10. "Vozite bezbrižno" – 2:57
11. "Sveštenik" – 2:32
12. "Snaga je u našoj mladoj generaciji" – 9:47

== Personnel ==
- Mileta Mijatović - samples
- Damjan Brkić - samples, programming
- Vladimir Lenhart - bass guitar
