= Nieman (disambiguation) =

Nieman may refer to:

- An alternative name for Neman river
- Nieman (surname)
- Nieman Fellowship
- Nieman R-10, Soviet aircraft
