= Panik (band) =

German rock band

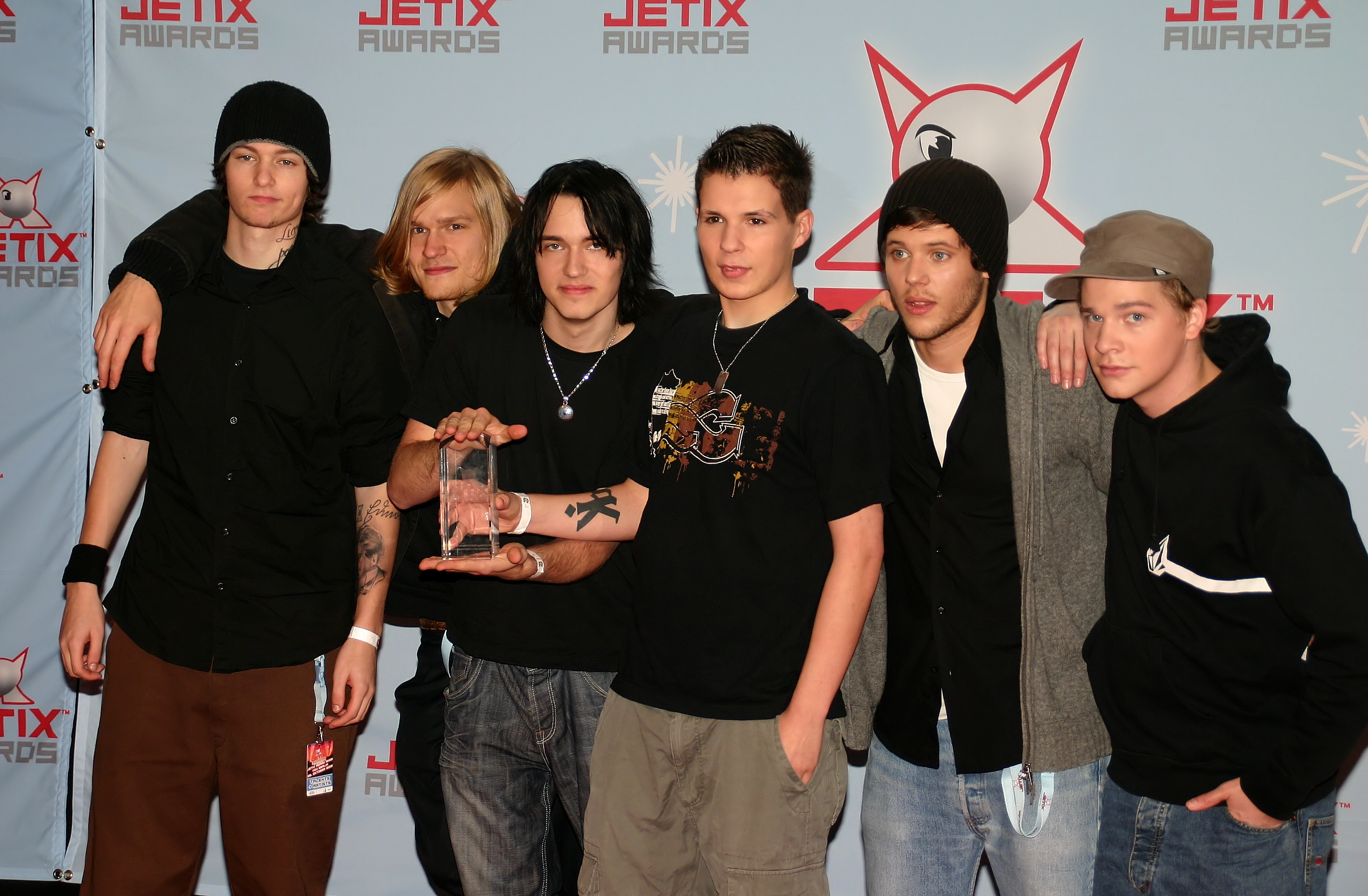
- Band performance in 2008

Background information
- Also known as: Pan!k (2002–2007), Nevada Tan (2007)
- Origin: Neumünster, Germany
- Genres: Rap rock; alternative rock
- Years active: 2002–2010, 2016-present
- Labels: Universal, Vertigo
- Spinoffs: BonkSonnenschein, Zorkkk
- Members: Timo "T:mo" Sonnenschein; David Bonk; Frank "Franky" Ziegler; Juri Schewe; Jan Werner
- Website: panik-musik.de

Panik is a German rock band from Neumünster that was established in 2002 under the name Pan!k. This band consisted of David Bonk (guitar, vocals), Timo "T:Mo" Sonnenschein (rap/vocals), Jan Werner (DJ) and Max Böhlen (drums). With the addition of Frank "Franky" Ziegler (vocals), Christian Linke (bass guitar) and replacement of Max Böhlen with Juri Schewe on drums, the band changed its name to Nevada Tan in 2007 and released its first studio album Niemand Hört Dich to commercial success in Germany.

On 20 January 2008 Nevada Tan announced that they had officially changed their name to Panik due to difficulties with the management, resulting in switch from Universal Records to Vertigo Records. On 25 September 2009, Panik released its self-titled studio album. As of November 2009, all of the Panik members except Bonk and Sonnenschein officially left the band. On 24 April 2010 Panik played a farewell concert in Paris, France. In 2010, Bonk and Sonnenschein started a duo project named BonkSonnenschein indicating they will not continue to release music as Panik.

In 2016, David Bonk and Timo Sonnenschein reunited with Frank Ziegler and released a music video "Ausnahmezustand" under the new band moniker Zorkkk.

In 2017, the band reunited as Panik for the 10 years anniversary shows in Germany and Russia.

== History ==
=== Pan!k and Nevada Tan (2002–2007) ===
The band was established in 2002 under the name Pan!k and consisted of David Bonk (guitar, vocals), Timo "T:Mo" Sonnenschein (rap/vocals), Jan Werner (DJ) and Max Böhlen (drums). With the addition of Frank "Franky" Ziegler (vocals), Christian Linke (bass) and replacement of Max Böhlen with Juri Schewe on drums, the band changed its name to Nevada Tan in 2007. The new name came from Nevada-tan, an internet meme of Japanese schoolgirl who committed the Sasebo slashing.

Nevada Tan had its first official performance at The Dome 41 in Mannheim, on 2 March 2007. The band performed at the biggest open-air concert of the summer of 2007, the Schau nicht weg! (Don't look away!) concert, organized by BRAVO and VIVA, against school violence. The concert was held on 25 August 2007, in front of the Brandenburger Tor. More than 50 stars came to support this event. There were 119 000 people in the audience. Nevada Tan were one of the eight main performing acts, the other seven being LaFee, Sarah Connor, Bushido, Monrose, Gentleman, MIA. and US5.

During the summer of 2007 they had a concert in Paris, France, and due to an unexpected number of fans, they went back for few more concerts in October.

The first Nevada Tan tour was supposed to be held from October to November 2007; however, their supporting act had a car crash. At the end of October they had an accident on their way to Celle, although David was the only one injured. David later said that he was shocked by the accident but soon ran out of the bus to check on the woman who had crashed into the car. She was fine and had no injuries of any kind. He also said that he was happy because there were no severe injuries and everyone was ok. He was released from the hospital later that same day, with only a few scratches on his face. He was able to play at the next concert, though the tour bus had to be repaired, and part of the equipment was damaged. The tour was postponed when Franky was diagnosed with laryngitis. By that time most of the crew was infected with the flu. The tour was subsequently finished in December 2007, while the old tickets were still valid.

The band debuted successfully in the German charts: the first single Revolution entered the charts at #15, the debut album Niemand hört dich (Nobody Hears You) peaked at #8 in the album charts and the DVD Niemand hört dich – Live entered at #10 in the DVD charts.

The band received major support from the BRAVO magazine and German music television VIVA.

=== Panik and break-up (2008–2010) ===
On 20 January 2008 Nevada Tan announced that they had officially changed their name to Panik dafter they demanded a civil suit from their old producers and managers. The band claimed to have been cheated out of money, and had not received a penny from the CD Niemand Hört Dich. They also revealed that they had been used and that the producers and manager had plan to exploit them as some pop teenie band. In an interview with stern TV they showed parts of videos that Timo had recorded and showed them to see how they had treated Panik. David also said that he had gone about four days without a shower, and that they were forced not to leave the studio and sleep on the floor. Also, without the band knowing it the producers and managers had gone ahead and put legal rights under the name "Nevada Tan" therefore if the band wanted to leave they could not use the same name. In the stern TV interview it was revealed because of what had been done to the band and the fact that the producers and manager used them the contract was null and void. As a result, the band switched from Universal Records to Vertigo Records.

On 25 September 2009, Panik released its self-titled studio album.

On 11 November 2009 it was announced on the Panik homepage and Myspace that the band was dissolving come the end of their December 2009 tour.

In his Myspace blog, Timo released this apology to his fans both in the original German and in an English translation:

"It's tough for us to write these lines. As yet it's been a long struggle, an exhausting way, and a part of the band doesn't have the energy to walk this way anymore. It hurts but we have to understand and accept. Due to this, we're forced to announce the band PANIK will not go on in this constellation, and the tour in December will be the last tour in Germany.

As someone on the outside you don't really know nor learn much about the music business. You hear a song and if you like it, you get it, no matter legally or illegally, and that pretty much wraps it up in the most cases. We are living in a world, where you can get music for free, but we can´t live without at least minimum of money. What's behind each and every song is unknown to the most. A production, a management, a record label, a publisher and many, many more people and things. If one of these pillars breaks away, it's tough for the band to fully focus on the music. It's just too much politics; sometimes it's a never-ending fight to do what you actually want. Just music.

For this album release we fought and set all the stuff we didnt want aside. We didnt "prostitute" ourselves. Unfortunately it's inevitable with our attitude and approach that a few of those supporting pillars break away. All we can say is that not many bands went through the stuff we had to.
Loads of people kept telling us that we are pretty much like a magnet, attracting the shadowsides of this business. We'd like to thank all the people who accompanied us in the last couple of years and stood in our rows loyal to the core. It was a great and unbelievable time with you. You're great. And we think you might feel a little as we do. An era comes to an end and this era was that unique due to you folks.

Thanks.... Your guys from PANIK

Ah, and for fuck sake, the questionable journalism of the German youth magazines doesn't even allow us to explain this to our fans first. Frank never was in touch with that magazine... Thank you very much. "

On 24 April 2010 Panik played a farewell concert in Paris, France where all the former members were present except Linke. A replacement bassist, Tim Klein from Destination Anywhere, played his part.

Bonk and Sonnenschein have announced that Panik would continue indefinitely, but in 2010 they started a duo project named BonkSonnenschein indicating they will not continue to release music as Panik.

=== Post-break up activity (2010–2016) ===
Timo produced a short film At Second Glance which was available on the Panik Kyte channel.

Frank "Franky" Ziegler has announced a role in the September 2010 Walt Disney Motion Pictures Germany GmbH film Single by Contract (Alles für Lila) as a guitarist in the band "Berlin Mitte". In an interview in Nuremberg during the Snipes shoestore tour, he elaborated on his role. Alles für Lila has been renamed 'Groupies bleiben nicht zum Frühstück'.

On 27 April 2010 Christian Linke announced that he had permanently taken up residence in California (USA). He continued to write and sing music, which was available on his new Myspace page, dertollelinke. He started working as QA tester at Riot Games, but got promoted to work on music. Eventually he became showrunner on Netflix series Arcane.

Juri Schewe has been mentioned as taking over a drum school.

"All that I know is that Juri decided to take over a drum school. He told me that his life rhythm has become very different, because he already knows his program for the year to come! He just wanted to be free and be able to do what he wanted."

The FAZ newspaper article Die Gruppe Panik: Verheddert im Musikdschungel (English: Music Group Panik: Adrift in the Music Jungle) offers these tidbits about Jan, Frank, and Juri's future plans:

Werner wird seine Lehre als chemisch-technischer Assistent fortsetzen, Schewe studiert seit Oktober Schlagzeug in Bremen, Ziegler hat eine Rolle im Film "Alles für Lila" ergattert.
(English: Werner will resume his studies as a chemical engineering assistant, Schewe has been studying drumming in Bremen since October, Ziegler has managed to snag a role in the film "Alles für Lila".)

This reaffirms Frank's upcoming role in Groupies bleiben nicht zum Frühstück (formerly "Alles für Lila") as well as Juri's drumming plans but this is the only information available about Jan Werner, though he has in the past reiterated that he would return to chemistry should his career in music end.

On 28 April 2010 Juri posted this blog on his Myspace:

April 28, 2010 – Wednesday

Piazu Manju
Check out my new band Piazu Manju:

Juri also listed numerous upcoming dates for Piazu Manju beginning in late May. This announcement, in light of Linke's absence at the final concert in Paris as well as his move to the United States to begin solo work, once again casts doubt on Panik's official announcement that the band had broken up due to stress and overwork on the parts of Juri, Linke, Jan, and Franky.

=== Zorkkk and Panik/Nevada Tan Live Reunion (2016-present) ===
In 2016, David Bonk and Timo Sonnenschein reunited with Frank Ziegler and released a music video "Ausnahmezustand" under the new band moniker Zorkkk on 28 April 2016.

On 9 February 2017 Panik played a 10 YRS Panik reunion show in Hamburg, Germany.

On 30 June 2017 the band played the anniversary show in Moscow, Russia, featuring all the members from 2007 except Linke who was replaced by Thorben Tschertner (bassist for Lina Larissa Strahl live band).

On 25 August 2021 the band released a Live Reunion album as Nevada Tan. It consists of seven live songs from 2017 reunion shows plus piano instrumental versions of four songs from Niemand hört dich and Panik.

== Band members ==
Current members

- David Bonk (born 6 February 1988) – guitar, vocals (2002–2010; 2016–present)
- Timo "T:mo" Sonnenschein (born 20 September 1987) – rap, vocals (2002–2010; 2016–present)
- Frank "Franky" Ziegler (28 April 1987) – vocals (2007–2010; 2016–present)
- Jan Werner (born 1 March 1988) – DJ, programming (2002–2010; 2016–present)
- Juri Schewe (born 24 November 1986) – drums, percussion (2007–2010; 2016–present)

Touring members

- Tim Klein – bass (2010)
- Thorben Tschertner – bass (2017)

Former members

- Max Böhlen (born 8 October 1987) – drums, percussion (2003–2006)
- Christian Linke (born 11 March 1987) – bass, guitar, backing vocals (2002–2009)

Franky, the singer of the band, is the only one who was born in South Germany, in Heidelberg. He met Linke through the internet. In order to meet the others, he went to Neumünster and, after being accepted as a band member, took up permanent residence there. He said that it was a bit difficult to get used to the fame, as he was raised in a small town; he has also said that he misses his home town and family. Next to the music he likes to cook and is often called "Bandmum" by his friends.

Timo is the rapper of Panik. His stepfather was the bass player of the German band Illegal 2001, so he had made his first music experiences very early in life. His hobbies include making films and music videos. The song Neustart is his personal showdown with the enemies he had in high school. He is also known just like David to resent his dad, Fred Sonnenschein, for having divorced his mother when he was 1. He often talks about all the hardships he had to face as a teen because he and his mother never got any support or money from his dad, even saying that at 15 he was working, and living as a really poor child in a one-room apartment with his mom.

David is the band's guitarist and piano player. He and T:mo have been best friends since David's first day in kindergarten(Timo was 4, David 3). Even though they went to different schools, they remained very close. The other band members meet in David's house to do brainstorming, and they play music in his garage. Also, in his house in the basement there is known that David has a studio which his mother and step-dad built and allowed David to continue his musical pursuits and are glad to allow him to. The song So Wie Du is based on his dad and how he left his family without a word and cheated on his wife. He is also the producer of the band's new album Was Würdest Du Tun? after some of the music was recorded at his house. On 28 May 2008 David was rushed to the hospital, the reasons remain unknown, only was it revealed that is doing better, on Panik's KYTE channel it shows the ambulance taking David away. It is rumored that he had some type of reaction. David has recently made claims during a Rock One Magazine interview to having composed the majority of the Panik album:

"Timo wrote 90% of the texts and sung more than half of the chorus on the last album, of which I almost composed the totality of the music."

The discography states otherwise, with Linke's name appearing on a good half of the songs.

David Bonk supported the birth centenary of British mathematician Alan Turing Rainbow festival with a programme for high school students focusing on various aspects in Science and Gender diversity organized by Gopi Shankar Madurai of Srishti Madurai, the first Genderqueer student resource circle of India, The Asia's first Genderqueer Pride parade and Genderqueer education programme for Schools and Colleges in Madurai was inaugurated by Anjali Gopalan along with David Bonk.

Jan is the band's DJ. The band said they are proud that their band has a DJ, on top of all the other instruments. Jan was the biggest mystery of the band, because in the beginning he wore a black mask that covered all of his face except for the eyes. Later, in an exclusive photo shoot for the BRAVO magazine, he took off his mask for the first time. Jan said that he was too shy to show his face as the band rose to fame, and he will remain masked at their concerts since it has become his trademark. He stopped wearing it after the band changed from Nevada Tan to Panik. He is now always seen with his mask off, having overcome his shyness. Jan spent time at a chemical lab before Nevada Tan emerged on the scene and has said previously that, should anything happen to the band, he would likely return to chemistry.

Juri is the former drummer of the band. The other band members describe him as the most hard-working of them all. He also finished high school with the highest average. He is the "boss" of the band: he talks to their label about important decisions, and takes care of financial and legal matters. In Juri's words, "David's domain is internet, Timo makes films and documents everything. Jan is our driver, Franky is the cook, and Linke is the one who always makes up something fun to do". He is also known to be very smart when it was revealed some of his grades were of the grade point 1,5 when in Germany the highest is 1,0. His full name is known to be Juri Ibo Kaya Schewe. He is the only one from the band who has had little trouble from fans and is more low key than the rest of the band. He also is known to be an active swimmer and to especially like pudding.

Linke, the former bassist, was also born in Neumünster. He is known to be fluent in English and an avid book reader. He has a tattoo on his forearm that reads Edmond Dantès (the main character from The Count of Monte Cristo) as well as a tattoo along the left side of his neck that reads "Licentia Poetica". Linke has said that the former tattoo should always remind him about how self-destructive revenge really is. He writes his own songs and covers songs from bands like "30 Seconds To Mars" or "Incubus". His full name is Christian Linke and he often is known to go by Chris, Linke, and Lefti (link- meaning left in German). He was the first member to leave the band after their German tour in December 2009 . He has since moved to the US to pursue a solo career. He released an album containing six of his songs. He took a job at Riot Games and is currently (2022) the showrunner for Arcane.

Max was the drummer before the band name changed to Nevada Tan. Very, very little is known of Max or why he left the band. It is likely he was a fellow schoolmate of Timo and Jan's due to the time frame of his leaving and his amicable presence on stage on the rare occasions when he has appeared at Nevada Tan/Panik concerts. He has never been publicly discussed by any of the members of Panik.

== Discography ==
=== Singles ===
- as Nevada Tan

Song title	GER	AUT	Released	
Revolution	15	25	30 March 2007	
Vorbei	29	42	8 June 2007	
Neustart	44	—	24 August 2007	
Wegweiser			January 2008	free download

- as Panik

Song title	GER	AUT	Released		
Was würdest du tun?	28	TBA	15 February 2008		
Lass mich fallen	TBA	TBA	4 September 2009		
Es ist Zeit			24 December 2009	free download	sung by Timo

=== Albums ===
- as Nevada Tan

Album	GER	AUT	CH	Released
Niemand hört dich	8	21	63	20 April 2007
Live Reunion	-	-	-	25 August 2021

- as Panik

Album	GER	AUT	CH	Released
Panik	-	-	-	25 September 2009

=== DVDs ===
DVD	GER	AUT	Released
Niemand hört dich – Live	10	—	28 September 2007
