= Dodole =

Studio album by Klopka Za Pionira
- Released: 2009
- Recorded: 2008–2009
- Genre: Noise-rock, alternative rock
- Length: 41:46
- Label: Ne-ton
- Producer: Damjan Brkić

Klopka Za Pionira chronology
Svinje (2007)	Dodole (2009)	Živa sila (2011)

Professional ratings
Review scores
Source	Rating
Popboks	7.5/10 stars

Dodole is an album by the Serbian noise-rock band Klopka Za Pionira, released in 2009 (see 2009 in music) on the Ne-ton independent label. This album is considered by many to be their most accessible to date. It took the band nearly two years to record and publish it, while they usually released several albums during one year. Thus it represents their most technically advanced effort (the band stated on their website that the album was "...carefully crafted over many months"). Musically, it contains songs with a more mainstream rock'n'roll approach, standard form and length (almost all of the songs are around three minutes, with lyrics, verses and choruses). The name of the album comes from the lyrics of the song "Pagani" (Serbian for pagans), in which the old pagan Slavic ritual of Dodole is mentioned. The cover illustration by Larisa Acikov depicts burning pagan totems.

== Track listing ==
All lyrics by Mileta Mijatović and music by Damjan Brkić ("with the ritual musicians' trance of Vladimir Lenhart and Đurađ Šimić") as listed on the liner notes

1. "Plivaj" – 3:16
2. "Pojedinac" – 6:02
3. "Čopor" – 3:06
4. "Pagani" – 3:09
5. "Pištolj" – 3:13
6. "Mržnja" – 2:53
7. "Oči" – 2:23
8. "Blato" – 2:22
9. "Gradovi" – 10:33
10. "Stranac" – 4:50

== Personnel ==
- Mileta Mijatović - vocals
- Damjan Brkić - guitar, drum machine
- Vladimir Lenhart - bass guitar, tapes
- Đurađ Šimić - organ, keyboard, vocals on track 5

== Production ==
- Recording engineers: Damjan Brkić and Đurađ Šimić
- Mixing engineer: Damjan Brkić
- Cover design: Larisa Acikov
