= Hessel Oosterbeek =

Dutch economist

- Born: March 11, 1959 (age 67); Gouda, Netherlands
- Education: University of Amsterdam
- Scientific career
- Fields: Economics
- Workplaces: SEO Economic Research; Cornell University; Stanford University; University of California, Berkeley; CESifo; Tinbergen Institute; Latin American Social Sciences Institute

Hessel Oosterbeek (born in Gouda, Netherlands, on March 11, 1959) is a Dutch economist. He currently works as Professor of Economics at the University of Amsterdam. In particular, Oosterbeek has conducted extensive research on the returns to schooling, the economics of training, investment contracts, and overeducation and has performed impact evaluations for various interventions in especially education. Oosterbeek ranks among the most-cited Dutch economists and the world's leading education economists.

== Biography ==
A native of Gouda, Hessel Oosterbeek began working as a bookseller after finishing high school, but began studying economics in 1980 at the University of Amsterdam (UVA). Therein, he earned a MSc and a PhD in, respectively, 1985 and 1992, the latter with a thesis on human capital theory. While studying at UVA, Oosterbeek worked at several research institutions in Amsterdam, including the Foundation for Economic Research (SEO), the Center for Educational Research, and the Institute for Public Expenditures, and became an assistant professor at UVA (1988–98). After his graduation and several visiting appointments at Cornell University, Stanford University, and the University of California, Berkeley, Oosterbeek was promoted to associate professor at UVA in 1998 and to full professor in 2000. Additionally, he maintains professional affiliations with CESifo, Tinbergen Institute, the Amsterdam Institute for International Development, the Max Goote Center for Vocational Education and Training, and the Latin American Social Sciences Institute (FLACSO). Moreover, he has been a member of the editorial boards of the Economics of Education Review and Effective Education.

== Research ==
Hessel Oosterbeek's research interests include the economics of education, impact evaluation, experimental economics and development economics, which he has often explored in collaborations with notably Edwin Leuven, Randolph Sloof, Bas van der Klaauw and Joep Sonnemans. His research with Dinand Webbink in De Economist on higher education enrollment in the Netherlands won the 1997 Hennipman Award. According to IDEAS/RePEc, Oosterbeek belongs to the top 3% of economists registered on IDEAS as ranked by research output.

=== Research on the economics of education ===
==== Research on overeducation ====
One early but persistent area of Oosterbeek's research is over-education in the Netherlands. Together with Joop Hartog, he finds that due to more higher education enrollment, undereducation in the Netherlands decreased throughout the 1960s and 1970s while overeducation increased, though the rate of return to education is positive even in cases of "overeducation", implying that overeducation doesn't necessarily imply private or social inefficiency. By contrast, Oosterbeek and Hartog don't observe health, wealth or happiness among Dutch to increase linearly in education: individuals with only a non-vocational secondary school degree are generally healthier, wealthier and happier than TVET or university graduates; moreover, they find IQ to increase health, social background to increase wealth, and being a woman to increase happiness. Oosterbeek's research on overeducation (and mismatch) are reviewed in his and Leuven's synthesis of those economic literatures in the Handbook of the Economics of Education.

==== Research on the returns to education ====
Another early area of Oosterbeek's research concerns the returns to education. Together with Wim Groot, he finds strong support for the hypothesis that schooling enhances rather than uncovers productivity once schooling is disaggregated into effective, repeated, skipped, inefficient routing, and dropout years. Moreover, Oosterbeek argues – along with Colm Harmon and Orley Ashenfelter – that estimates of the returns to education are warped by reporting bias, which they find to account for a large share of the differences in earlier estimates that were attributed to differences in the methods of estimation; correcting for the bias, they find returns to education to be particularly high in the U.S. and to have increased throughout the 1980s and 1990s. In another contribution to the discussion on the sign and size of returns to education, Oosterbeek, Harmon and Ian Walker review the literature on the microeconomic returns to education and find that education unambiguously and substantially increases individuals' earnings. Finally, in work with Leuven and Hans van Ophem, Oosterbeek observes that about one third of the variation in wage differentials between skill groups in developed economies are explained by differences in the net supply of skill groups, with relative demand and supply being a particularly strong determinant of relative wages of low-skilled workers.

==== Research on the economics of training ====
A third area of research of Oosterbeek's research are the economics of private sector training. For the Netherlands in 1995, he finds workers' schooling, personal backgrounds, and job characteristics to determine their willingness to receive work-related training, while industry and workers' gender and age determine firms' gains from having a better trained workforce. Moreover, whereas for half of the untrained workers the expected net returns to training for the firms would be positive and those of the workers negative, for another third of untrained workers the opposite would have held true. Furthermore, comparing the demand and supply of training in Canada, Switzerland, the Netherlands and the US, Oosterbeek and Leuven find that the employer is typically the provider of training and often willing to pay for general training, that international differences in training largely reflect differences in the weights of certain worker and job characteristics, and that the demand for training tends to increase in workers' education and training. Analysing the impact of legislation enabling Dutch firms to claim a larger share of their expenditures on employees' training if they are aged 40 or older, they find that the training rate of workers just above the age of 40 is 15–20% higher than that of workers just below 40, with the effect mainly reflecting the postponement of earlier training needs and having no significant effect on workers' wages. However, using an estimation method in which they narrow down the comparison group to workers who wanted private-sector training but were unable to participate because of random events, Oosterbeek and Leuven observe only much smaller, statistically insignificant returns to training.

==== Other research on the economics of education ====
Further topics in the economics of education wherein Oosterbeek has performed important research include the impacts of extra funding for IT on disadvantaged pupils' school achievement, of financial rewards for students, of entrepreneurship education, student exchanges, class size, and differences in gender-specific competitiveness. In particular, he finds that extra funding for personnel or computers and software targeted at primary schools with large populations of disadvantaged students significantly decrease student achievement, with extra funding for IT being particularly detrimental for girls (with Leuven, Webbink and Mikael Lindahl). By contrast, he finds that smaller classes in the last three years of primary school in Sweden substantially increase cognitive and noncognitive ability at age 13, school achievement at age 16, and wages, earnings, and education completion throughout ages 27 to 42 (with Per Fredriksson and Björn Öckert). Regarding secondary school, he finds gender-specific differences in competitiveness among Dutch high school students to explain about a fifth of gender differences in the choice of academic tracks, wherein boys tend to choose substantially more prestigious and thus more math- and science-intensive tracks than girls, as they tend to be more competitive (with Thomas Buser and Muriel Niederle). Finally, with regard to university, he finds studying abroad and studying abroad longer to increase the probability of erstwhile exchange students living abroad among Dutch students (with Webbink); the offer of financial rewards for Dutch university freshmen who pass all required first-year subjects to increase only the achievement of high-ability students while decreasing that of low-ability students and the effects to worsen over time, possibly due to the erosion of intrinsic motivation by the extrinsic reward (with Leuven and van der Klaauw); and a major Dutch entrepreneurship education programme to have no impact on college students' self-assessed entrepreneurship skills and to in fact decrease their entrepreneurial intentions.

=== Research on public-private wage differentials, ultimatum games and gender diversity ===
Lastly, Oosterbeek has also conducted miscellaneous research on topics such as public-private wage differentials, ultimatum games and gender diversity:

- In the early 1990s, the earnings prospects of Dutch public sector workers were better in the public sector than in the private sector and vice versa, pointing to comparative advantages among workers (with Hartog).
- In ultimatum games, responders (but not proposers) display significant differences in their behaviour depending on geographic region, though these differences are poorly correlated with cultural traits such as Hofstede's cultural dimensions (with Sloof and van de Kuilen).
- Business teams with an equal gender mix to outperform male-dominated teams with regard to sales and profits, though neither complementarities, learning, monitoring, and conflicts (with van Praag and Sander Hoogendoorn).
