= Klopka Za Pionira =

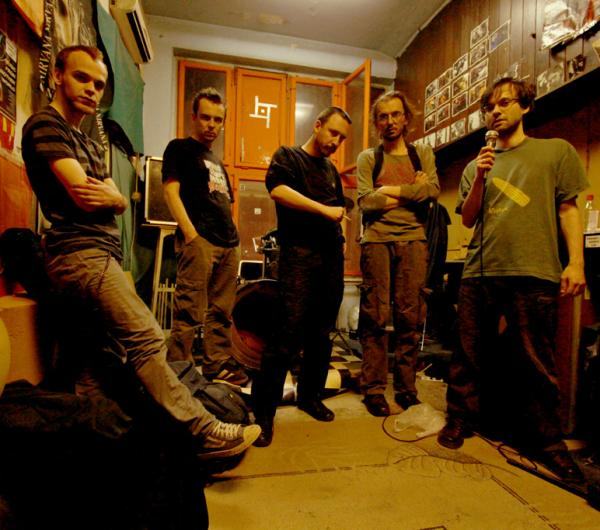
- Klopka Za Pionira in BIGZ rehearsal studio, 2010 (from left to right): Relja Ilić, Vladimir Lenhart, Đurađ Šimić, Mileta Mijatović, Damjan Brkić

Background information
- Origin: Serbia
- Genres: Noise-rock, industrial, punk rock
- Years active: 2003 – present
- Label: Ne-ton
- Members: Mileta Mijatović; Damjan Brkić; Tihomir Živković
- Past members: Vuk Palibrk; Zoran Jović; Relja Ilić; Vladimir Lenhart; Đurađ Šimić; Stefan Malešević
- Website: www.klopkazapionira.net

Klopka Za Pionira (Serbian Cyrillic: Клопка За Пионира; English: Trap for the Pioneer) is a noise-rock band from Serbia. Their music is built on improvisation, lyrics written by the band's vocalist Mileta Mijatović. The band has published 11 albums and EPs and two live albums on the independent record label Ne-ton.

== History ==
The band was formed in 2003 by Mileta Mijatović and Damjan Brkić in Pančevo. The band's name represented their opinion that those who attempt to create something new encounter many obstacles. While initially a duo, the band was soon joined by the bassist Vladimir Lenhart (from the bands Pamba and Petrol).

During 2004 and 2005 the band had a drummer - first Vuk Palibrk (from the band Elektrolasta) and then Zoran Jović (from Napred U Prošlost and Trigger) - but they are usually recognized by the use of drum machines. Đurađ Šimić joined the band on keyboards before recording of the album Dodole and has performed with them since. Since 2005 their rhythm section consisted only of drum machines (programmed by Damjan Brkić) until they were again joined by a drummer in early 2010 - Relja Ilić from Fancy Frogs.

In 2009 their album Dodole appeared on the Popboks list of best albums for 2009.

After more than a year of performing the Dodole tracks live and not working on any new material, the band was invited by the organizers of the Koperground festival to compose and record a couple of new songs in the local radio-television station's studio. They traveled to Slovenia in summer of 2010 and recorded the album in a shortened line-up (minus the drummer and the keyboard player) backed by the guest contributions of their sound engineer Stefan Malešević. After recording the album, the band had problems with preparing their live sets, due to the line-up differences between new and old material and the fact that the band members lived in different cities. After trying out various combinations, the band has currently settled on their earliest line-up, consisting only of Mijatović and Brkić. Šimić has compiled a remix album of Živa sila, available as a free download on the band's website, Lenhart is opening with a DJ-set on live shows, and Relja Ilić definitely left the band during the mixing sessions of Živa Sila, without contributing to any of the band's official discography.

== Discography ==
=== Studio albums ===
- Raj na Zemlji postoji (2004)
- Haker ili iskušavanje Đavola (2004)
- Vratićeš se Satane (2005)
- Planetarni čovek (2006)
- Neman (2006)
- Kupine (2006)
- Svinje (2007)
- Dodole (2009)
- Živa sila (2011)

=== Extended plays ===
- Jutro u fabrici (2005)
- Tao Business (2007)
- Fiskalna kasa za dilera grasa (2007)

=== Live albums ===
- Tamo ćete ponovo sresti mene (2004)
- Live @ Hybrida - Tarcento (2006)
