= Haker ili iskušavanje Đavola =

Haker ili iskušavanje đavola

Studio album by Klopka Za Pionira
- Released: 2004
- Recorded: 2004
- Genre: experimental, noise
- Length: 36:43
- Label: Ne-ton
- Producer: Damjan Brkić

Klopka Za Pionira chronology
Raj na Zemlji postoji (2004)	Haker ili iskušavanje đavola (2004)	Vratićeš se Satane (2005)

Haker ili iskušavanje đavola is the second album by the Serbian noise-rock band Klopka Za Pionira, released in 2004 (see 2004 in music) on the Ne-ton independent label. A big departure from the sound of first album, this album is unique by many standards in the band's body of work. It is the only album without Vladimir Lenhart, since there are no bass lines in any of the songs. Also, there is no guitar and no vocal input from Mileta Mijatović, the band's singer. The whole album consists of various machine buzzes and computer generated noises accompanied by a large amount of sampled voices originating from English translations of speeches by Josip Broz Tito, operas in Serbian, children's educational records, Orthodox chanting, the opening speech from a concert entitled "Trumpets of Peace" held in Sarajevo 1977, "The Internationale" sung in Serbian, various commercials, old Yugoslav movies, SpongeBob SquarePants dubbed in Serbian, etc.

The cover art features a collage of toy robot images. The name of the album is translated into "Hacker Or Tempting The Devil". Hacker was chosen as album's name because of the heavy use of sampling and lack of non-computer generated sounds, while "tempting the devil" alludes to many religious samples often juxtaposed to give a meaning completely different from the original.

On its official website, the band stated that the album deals with "the clash of past ideologies with present times through unusual combination of samples on the theme of totalitarianism and religion."

== Track listing ==
All music by Klopka Za Pionira

1. "Umesto uvoda" – 0:09
2. "Dva anđela" – 3:15
3. "Apolo 13" – 0:48
4. "Značaj osvajanja kosmosa" – 3:46
5. "Predstavljanje instrumenata" – 4:37
6. "Budućnost=restart" – 5:41
7. "Zdravo, zdravo, Đavo" – 4:23
8. "Trube mira" – 4:37
9. "Srećan put u XXI vek" – 8:27
10. "Umesto kraja" – 0:56
11. "TaTTa7"-6:26

== Personnel ==
- Mileta Mijatović - samples
- Damjan Brkić - samples, programming
