= Fiskalna kasa za dilera grasa =

Extended play by Klopka Za Pionira

EP by Klopka Za Pionira
- Released: 2007
- Recorded: 2007
- Genre: Alternative rock, noise-rock
- Length: 8:11
- Label: Ne-ton
- Producer: Damjan Brkić

Klopka Za Pionira chronology
Tao Business EP (2007)	Fiskalna kasa za dilera grasa (2007)	Svinje (2007)

Fiskalna kasa za dilera grasa is an EP by the Serbian noise-rock band Klopka Za Pionira, released in 2007 (see 2007 in music) on the Ne-ton independent label. It contains two versions of the same song dealing with police brutality of a young man who was caught with a marijuana joint. The name of the EP means "Fiscal cash register for the grass dealer" and is actively advocating legalization of marijuana.

== Track listing ==
All lyrics by Mileta Mijatović and music by Klopka Za Pionira

1. "Fiskalna kasa za dilera grasa" – 4:11
2. "Nije gotovo dok se ne legalizuje" – 3:59

== Personnel ==
- Mileta Mijatović - vocals
- Damjan Brkić - guitar, drum machine
- Vladimir Lenhart - bass guitar, tapes
