= Planetarni čovek =

Studio album by Klopka Za Pionira
- Released: 2006
- Recorded: January–February 2006
- Genre: Noise, industrial
- Length: 45:05
- Label: Ne-ton
- Producer: Damjan Brkić

Klopka Za Pionira chronology
Jutro u fabrici EP (2005)	Planetarni čovek (2006)	Neman (2006)

Planetarni čovek is an album by the Serbian noise-rock band Klopka Za Pionira, released in 2006 (see 2006 in music) on the Ne-ton independent label. It is one of the more seriously crafted albums by Klopka, and the first recorded on professional equipment. This album contains a cover version of Tom Waits' song "Poor Edward", translated into Serbian. The album cover was drawn by Maja Veselinović.

== Track listing ==
All lyrics by Mileta Mijatović (except where noted) and music by Damjan Brkić (liner notes list Vladimir Lenhart as author of bass lines))

1. "Prstima pritisni oči" – 3:42
2. "1000 paranoja" – 4:52
3. "Siromašni Edvard" – 3:21 - Tom Waits Google translated into Serbian
4. "Karta sveta" – 5:18
5. "Da li hoćeš da ti pevam" – 1:00
6. "Red i mir" – 4:30 - lyrics by Momčilo Bajagić and Minja Subota
7. "Svet te steže" – 6:14
8. "Nije neka pravda" – 4:26
9. "Pobuna robota" – 3:46
10. "Vranjina" – 7:52

== Personnel ==
- Mileta Mijatović - vocals, trumpet
- Damjan Brkić - guitar, drum machine
- Vladimir Lenhart - bass guitar
