= De Balie =

Theatre, cinema and arts centre in Amsterdam, Netherlands

Coordinates: 52°21′47″N 4°53′0″E

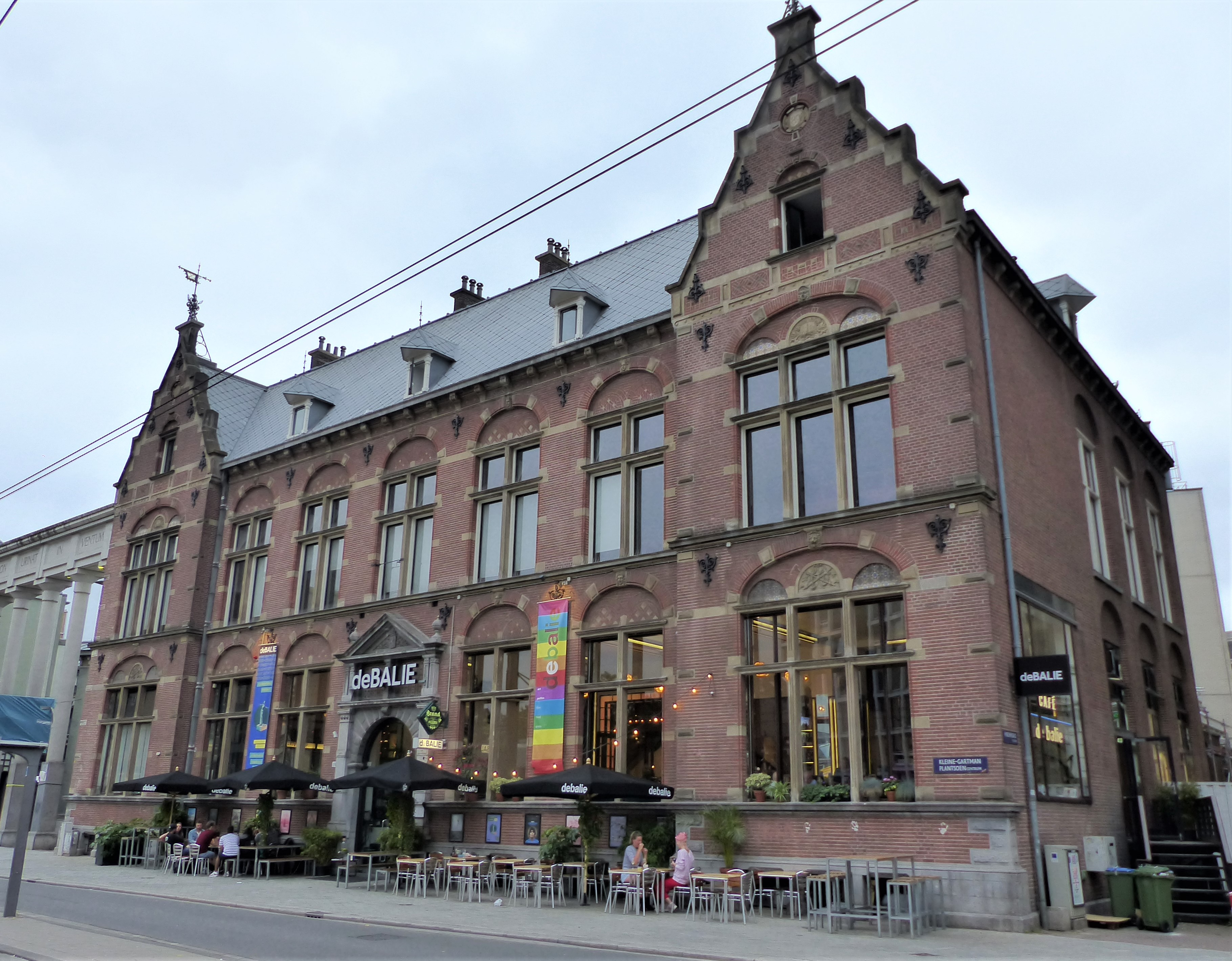
De Balie

De Balie is a Dutch organization that produces independent journalistic programs about art, culture and politics. De Balie is located at Kleine-Gartmanplantsoen 10, near Leidseplein in Amsterdam.

== History ==
When the 19th-century building of the Amsterdam Cantonal Court was threatened to be demolished in order to build an eight-storey Bouweshotel in the late 1970s, Amsterdammers, including politician Hedy d'Ancona and artist Wim T. Schippers, launched the campaign "Bouw es wat anders" to prevent this from happening. The city council was persuaded, and a good destination for the building was found in art center De Balie in 1982. Rottenberg led the organization together with Paul Hermanides and, in the mid-1980s, ordered the conversion of the courthouse into a theatre complex. Architect Rogier Weijand designed the Grand Café in Art Deco style.

== Organisation ==
Yoeri Albrecht is general and artistic director. Femke Monaghan-van Wachem is business director. Mirjam van Praag is chair of the supervisory board. In addition to the management, De Balie's organization consists of the editorial staff, and the departments of communication, finance, theatre technology, development, building and system management and the staff of the Grand Café. More than a hundred people work in De Balie.

The editors of De Balie are a group of program makers that produce about 400 live events a year under the leadership of Yoeri Albrecht. In addition, De Balie works with partners from all parts of society. De Balie is part of the international network for debate centers Time to Talk.

== Programme ==
In its programmes, De Balie offers a stage to guests from the fields of arts, politics and science. The programs often combine various disciplines, such as theatre, visual arts and debate.

The programmes in De Balie are often broadcast live on the internet via De Balie TV. De Balie's programs have also been (increasingly) available on YouTube since 2012. De Balie offers a fair amount of programmes in English, often with prominent international speakers.

De Balie's programmes are not without controversy - for example, in 2017, De Balie held an event called "Waarom haten ze ons eigenlijk?" ("Why do they hate us anyway?") wherein speakers discussed the deportation of Muslims. In 2019, Mona Eltahawy cancelled a planned appearance at the venue citing this and other previous events.

== Cinema ==
De Balie is also a movie theatre with daily programming characterized by documentaries and arthouse films with social relevance. Special programs with talks and debate are regularly organized around film screenings. De Balie works together with movie theatre Rialto for its daily programming.

== Venues ==
De Balie has three theater rooms (Grote zaal, Salon and Pleinzaal) and a cinema.

=== De Grote zaal ===
De Grote zaal (great venue) of De Balie was renovated in September 2011 and restored to its classic condition. The rooms of De Balie are also rented out for conferences, meetings, presentations and recordings. The hall has a retractable stand, which allows for multiple room configurations and offers space for a maximum of 220 people.

=== Kleine zaal ===
The Kleine Zaal is furnished as a cinema and offers space for 54 people.

=== Salon ===
The Salon, which is suitable for small-scale programs such as lectures, presentations, debates and film screenings, has a small stage. The hall is characterized by authentic stained glass windows. The Salon is also intended for meetings or workshops and has a capacity of 85 visitors.

=== Pleinzaal ===
The Pleinzaal is the only venue of De Balie that is located on the Leidseplein side of the building. The hall is used for programs for a small audience, or where the focus is on recordings of video or audio productions. The hall is decorated with a permanent work of art by Barbara Broekman. It can accommodate about 35 people.

== Archive ==
Over the years De Balie has created an extensive archive that hosts dossiers, articles and videos of previous programmes and topics. In the past some quite divergent programmes have been shown in De Balie. Some examples:

- Geheugen, Spreek!: Under that title, the Amsterdam Literary Activities Foundation organized a lecture cycle on forms of memory.
- Pussy Riot: an interview with members of Pussy Riot and a screening of the documentary Pussy Riot: A Punk Prayer.
- Marlene Dumas: a conversation about her work and a screening of Miss Interpreted (Marlene Dumas).
- And Justice for ALL: a series on the international rule of law, in which diverging topics like Sharia law, censorship in China, justice and injustice have been discussed.
- Not in my backyard: an international current affairs show of De Balie, which dealt with topics like the situation at the Western Bank, Mexico and the drugs cartels and modern piracy.
- Kenniscafé: a program that puts science (and scientists) on the spot. Current theme's like nuclear energy, obesity, lab-rats and robots have been debated by experts and commentators.
- India Express: a program that shows India through the eyes of Indian intellectuals and artists.
- Crash Course Congo: The current, past and future of Congo have been investigated in a series of six episodes. Among other things, the focus was on religious soaps, modern art and culture and soap in emergency help-packages.

All of De Balie programmes are broadcast live on their website.

== Grandcafé ==
Next to the theatre- and debate centre, the Grandcafé is also a valuable asset to De Balie. The Grandcafé offers room for food and drinks, but also for meetings. The café is open seven days a week and serves good coffee, lunch, a quick bite to eat, drinks or a full-blown dinner. Free Wi-Fi is available and plugs can be found.
