= Kupine =

Studio album by Klopka Za Pionira
- Released: 2006
- Recorded: 2006
- Genre: Noise, industrial
- Length: 42:14
- Label: Ne-ton
- Producer: Damjan Brkić

Klopka Za Pionira chronology
Neman (2006)	Kupine (2006)	Tao Business EP (2007)

Kupine is an album by the Serbian noise-rock band Klopka Za Pionira, released in 2006 (see 2006 in music) on the Ne-ton independent label. This is one of the more experimental and ambient sounding albums by Klopka, containing long, slowly developing songs with many ambient nature-like sounds but also various machine noises and loops. The album contains very few lyrics, appearing now and then in some of the songs.

It also contains the first version of the song "Šta me gledaš" which a year later appeared on the album Svinje and became a live standard for the band.

The name of the album is Serbian for 'blackberries'.

== Track listing ==
All lyrics by Mileta Mijatović and music by Klopka Za Pionira

1. "Elka" – 5:58
2. "Civilizacija" – 4:44
3. "Elka12" – 3:54
4. "Šta me gledaš" – 1:29
5. "Kupine" – 10:31
6. "Elka17" – 3:34
7. "Palestina" – 2:41
8. "Elka16" – 9:19

== Personnel ==
- Mileta Mijatović - vocals
- Damjan Brkić - guitar, drum machine
- Vladimir Lenhart - bass guitar, tapes
