= I Nyoman Ansanay =

Indonesian footballer (born 2001)

Personal information
- Full name: I Nyoman Nikson Ansanay
- Date of birth: 8 July 2001 (age 25)
- Place of birth: Jayapura, Indonesia
- Height: 1.75 m (5 ft 9 in)
- Position: Right-back

Youth career
- 2018–2019: Persipura Jayapura

Senior career*
Years	Team	Apps	(Gls)
2019–2022	Persipura Jayapura	11	(0)
2022	Persewar Waropen	7	(1)
2023–2025	PSS Sleman	11	(0)
- * Club domestic league appearances and goals as of 30 April 2024

I Nyoman Nikson Ansanay (born 8 July 2001) is an Indonesian professional footballer who plays as a right-back.

== Club career ==
=== Persipura Jayapura ===
He was signed for Persipura Jayapura to play in Liga 1 in the 2019 season. Ansanay made his first-team debut on 18 May 2019 in a match against Persib Bandung at the Si Jalak Harupat Stadium, Soreang.

=== Persewar Waropen ===
On 16 June 2022, it was announced that Ansanay would be joining Persewar Waropen for the 2022-23 Liga 2 campaign.

=== PSS Sleman ===
Ansanay was signed for PSS Sleman to play in Liga 1 in the 2023–24 season. He made his debut on 1 July 2023 in a match against Bali United at the Kapten I Wayan Dipta Stadium, Gianyar.
