= Niemann =

Niemann is a Low German surname comparable to Neumann. Notable people with the surname include:

- Albert Niemann (chemist) (1834–1861), German chemist
- Albert Niemann (paediatrician) (1880–1921), German physician
- Albert Niemann (tenor) (1831–1917), German opera singer
- Ben Niemann (born 1995), American football player
- Brausch Niemann (born 1939), South African racing driver
- Carl Niemann (1908–1964), American biochemist
- Dries Niemann (1927–2009), South African boxer
- Edmund John Niemann (1813–1876), British artist
- Gunda Niemann-Stirnemann (born 1966), German speed skater
- Hans Moke Niemann (born 2003), American chess grandmaster
- Henry Niemann (1838–1899), German-born American pipe organ builder
- Jeff Niemann (born 1983), American baseball player
- Jerrod Niemann (born 1979), American country music singer
- Joaquín Niemann (born 1998), Chilean golfer
- Johan Niemann (born 1977), Swedish bassist
- Johann Niemann (1913–1943), Nazi SS officer
- Kristian Niemann (born 1971), Swedish guitarist
- Nick Niemann (born 1997), American football player
- Noel Niemann (born 1999), German footballer
- Paige Niemann, American social media personality
- Randy Niemann (born 1955), American baseball coach and player

== See also ==
- Niemann–Pick disease
- Niemann-Pick disease, type C
- Niemann-Pick disease, SMPD1-associated
- Niemann Foods
