= Paige Niemann =

American internet personality

- Born: April 26, 2004 (age 22); Modesto, California, United States
- Occupations: Digital influencer; content creator; model; make-up artist
- Years active: c. 2014–present

TikTok information
- Page: paigeniemann
- Followers: 10.1 million
- Last updated: July 10, 2026

Paige Niemann (born 2004) is an American Internet personality and Social Media content creator, more known for her content on TikTok and Instagram. In 2019, she went viral on the video sharing app TikTok due to her resemblance to Ariana Grande.

== Early life ==
Paige Niemann was born on April 26, 2004 in Modesto, California. She was home-schooled. Niemann is half Sicilian and half German. According to Niemann, she was first compared to Ariana Grande by someone at her school when she was 10 years old. At the age of twelve, Niemann started posting selfies and videos of herself dressed as Grande on musical.ly (now TikTok).

== Career ==
In November 2019, after a two year break from posting, Niemann posted a video of herself dressed as Ariana Grande and lipsincing to her song "Successful" on TikTok. She was 15 years old. Three weeks later, Niemann stated that Grande sent her a direct message in response to her video where she was dressed as the pop star’s Nickelodeon character on Victorious.

In 2022, Niemann launched her OnlyFans page. Her bio included the phrase, "Exclusive content that you normally wouldn't see from me!" The backlash led to her first TikTok ban.

In 2023, during New York Fashion Week, she walked the runway for the Creators Inc. x Bossi show. She also appeared in an Alexander Wang ad for their Ricco bag. The bag closely resembled a previously released bag, Rocco. All of the "stars" in the ad were impersonators, including Niemann as Ariana Grande. Other stars portrayed were Taylor Swift and Beyoncé. In January 2025, she appeared on the red carpet dressed as Grande for the premier of the movie Companion, fooling some reporters.

In February 2025, it was reported by Rolling Stone that a new reality show starring Niemann was in production with Brandon Washington, aka "WriterBoy" and WriterBoyFilms. In late 2025 and early 2026, Niemann appeared to dial back on her social media activity. She appeared on a red carpet as herself, rather than doing her impersonation.

== Reception ==
Paige Niemann has received bans on the platforms Instagram and TikTok. In August 2021, Niemann received criticism from fans when she shared herself imitating Grande’s wedding appearance. In 2022, fans said she had crossed a line when she created her OnlyFans account during the same time she was posting frequently dressed as Ariana Grande’s character in the film Wicked. Concerns were raised that some fans may have been led to believe the profile belonged to the pop star due to the bio's ambiguous wording.

According to People, comments have been made by plastic surgeons suggesting she had work done to further resemble the pop star. One plastic surgeon, Kshem Yapa, stated it was apparent that Niemann had received lip, cheekbone, jawline, and chin filler.

As of early 2026, Nieman had approximately 10 million followers on Tiktok and 823,000 followers on Instagram.
