= Destination Anywhere (band) =

German ska punk and pop punk band

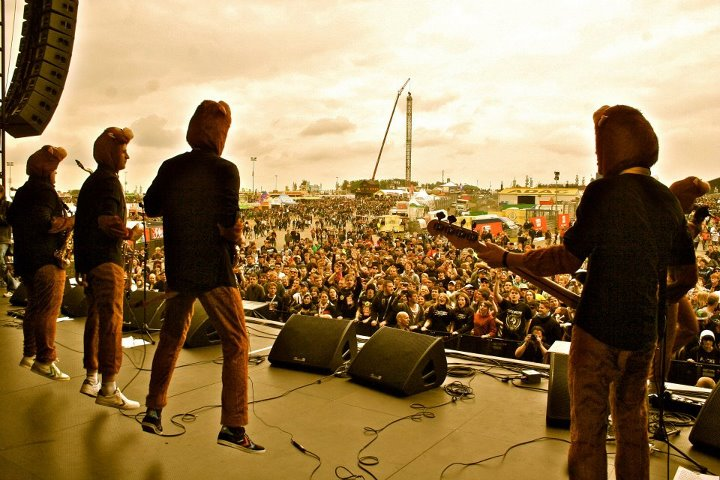
- Destination Anywhere onstage at Rock at the Ring in 2012

Background information
- Origin: Siegen, Germany
- Genres: Ska punk, pop punk
- Years active: 2006–2019
- Past members: David Conrad; Tim Klein; Peter Stock; André Rüddigkeit; Philipp Schopp; Christoph Zimmermann; Christian Jüngst; Simon Bradatsch
- Website: destinationanywhere.de

Destination Anywhere was a German ska punk/pop punk band from Siegen, North Rhine-Westphalia, Germany.

== History ==
The ska-punk band formed in Siegen, Germany, in 2006. Destination Anywhere consists of David Conrad (Singer), Tim Klein (Guitarist), Peter Stock (Drummer), André Rüddigkeit (Bassist), Philipp Schopp (Trumpeter), Christoph Zimmermann (Saxophonist) and Christian Jüngst (Saxophonist). Their first EP is called Coffee, horn & cigarettes and it was released in 2006, while the debut album Sobstuff, Tales & Anthems' in 2008 and has already been downloaded 15,000 times (still available for free on their website). At their concerts were sold 5.000 copies of the album in CD format.

After meeting the producer David Bonk, who worked with Panik, Nevada Tan, Aloha from Hell and LaFee, the band decided to collaborate with him and worked on new songs for their other EP You won't bring me down (2009). Their second album is called Party, Love & Tragedy, it was still produced by David Bonk, released in 2010 and made up of 13 tracks. The two songs "How you feel" and "It's going down" from their second album have their own music videos on YouTube, both directed by Timo Sonnenschein (Ex Panik). According to what the band said, they worked with Bonk again lately and the third album will be available in 2013.

Destination Anywhere supported the German rock band Panik in 2009 and they also played with them in Paris having the opportunity to present their music to a wider public. The band has played at some big music festivals in Germany like Mair1 Festival (2007–2008), The Traffic Jam Open Air (2011) and in 2012 they won "Ringrocker Bandcontest" and had the chance to perform at Rock Am Ring catchting the attention of the public not only for their music but also for the original show they offered, since they were dressed as monkeys and threw bananas from the stage. The Rhein-Zeitung published an article about them and their performance at Rock Am Ring, described as something new in the history of the festival.

On 1 March 2013 the band released their third album entitled Hier ist Godot (Here is Godot).

In spring 2019 the band announced their farewell tour, which took place in October 2019 and ended with a concert in Siegen.

== Discography ==
=== EPs ===
- 2006: Coffee, Horn & Cigarettes
- 2009: You wont bring me down
- 2014: Fuck Off!!

=== Albums ===
- Sobstuff, Tales & Anthems (2008)
- Party, Love & Tragedy (2010)
- Hier ist Godot (2013)
- Unter den Wolken (2016)
- Bomben (2018)
