= Sliedrecht =

- Municipality
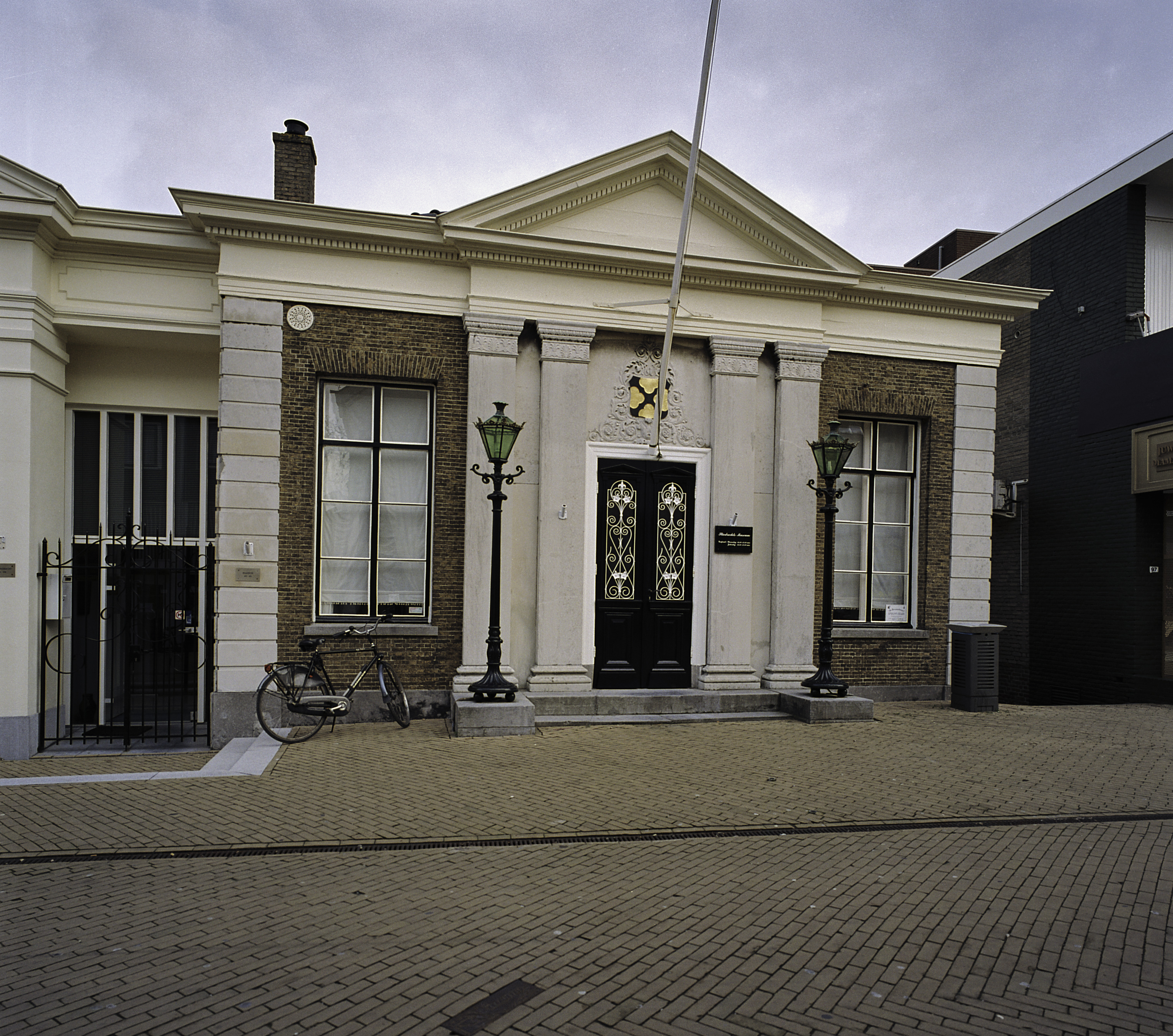
- Former city hall of Sliedrecht

- Flag Coat of arms

- Location in South Holland
- Coordinates: 51°49′N 4°46′E
- Country: Netherlands
- Province: South Holland

Government
  - Body: Municipal council
  - Mayor: Dirk van der Borg (CDA)

Area
  - Total: 14.01 km^{2} (5.41 sq mi)
  - Land: 12.84 km^{2} (4.96 sq mi)
  - Water: 1.17 km^{2} (0.45 sq mi)
- Elevation: 4 m (13 ft)

Population (January 2021)
  - Total: 25,597
  - Density: 1,994/km^{2} (5,160/sq mi)
- Demonym: Sliedrechter
- Time zone: UTC+1 (CET)
  - Summer (DST): UTC+2 (CEST)
- Postcode: 3360–3364
- Area code: 0184
- Website: www.sliedrecht.nl

Sliedrecht (Dutch pronunciation: [ˈslidrɛxt]) is a town and municipality in the western Netherlands, in the province of South Holland. The municipality covers an area of 14.01 km^{2} (5.41 sq mi) of which 1.17 km^{2} (0.45 sq mi) is covered by water.

Sliedrecht is known for the many large dredging companies (including Boskalis and IHC Merwede) that come from it. The Dredging Festival takes place in Sliedrecht every two years. The first IKEA store in the Netherlands opened in Sliedrecht in 1978, but it closed in 2006. Sliedrecht is also the site of the Nationaal Baggermuseum (National Dredging Museum) - featuring dredging and salvage.

== Topology ==
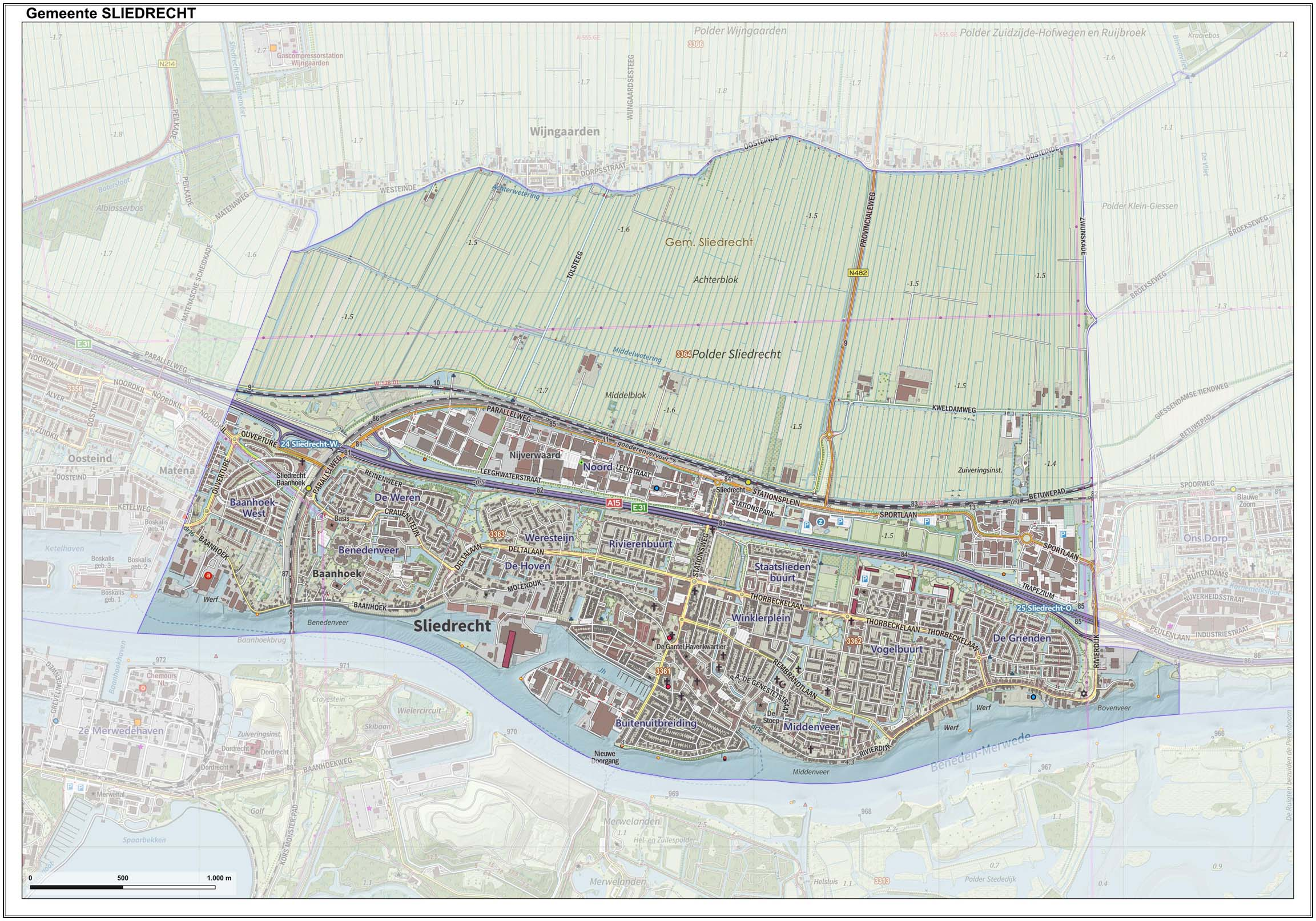

Topographic map of the municipality of Sliedrecht, June 2015

== Public transportation ==
Sliedrecht railway station and Sliedrecht Baanhoek railway station are situated on the Geldermalsen–Dordrecht railway.

Waterbus route 2:

- Dordrecht Merwekade - Dordrecht Hooikade - Zwijndrecht Veerplein - Papendrecht Veerdam - Papendrecht Oosteind - Hollandse Biesbosch - Sliedrecht Middeldiep

== Notable people ==
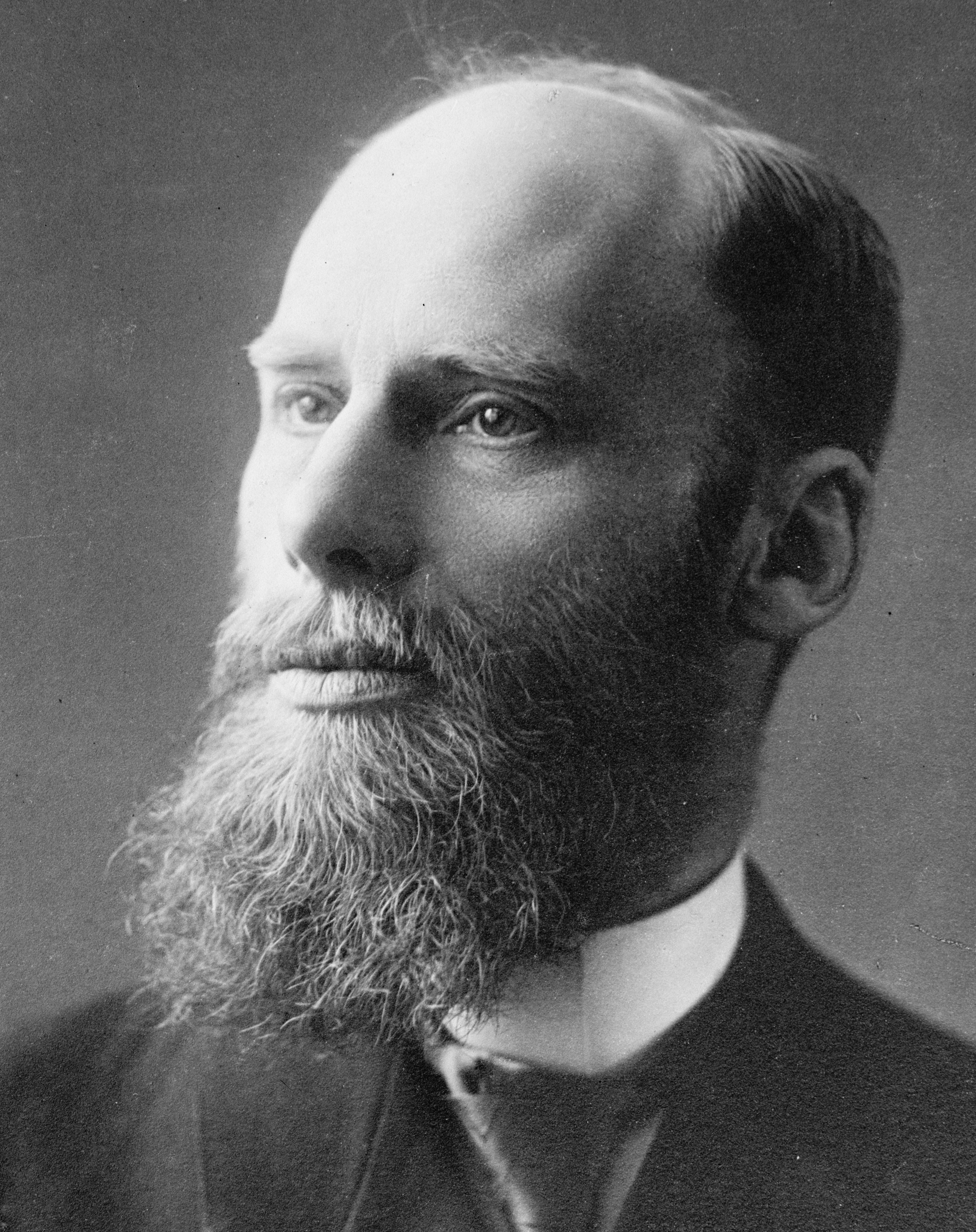
Jan Rudolph Slotemaker de Bruine, ca.1918

- Jan Rudolph Slotemaker de Bruïne (1869–1941) was a Dutch politician and theologian
- Wina Born (1920–2001) was a Dutch journalist and writer of cooking books
- Aad Nuis (1933–2007) was a Dutch politician and political scientist
- Bas van der Vlies (1942–2021) was a retired Dutch politician and teacher
- Jorien van den Herik (born 1943) is a Dutch business man, Chairman of Feyenoord Rotterdam 1992/2006
- Joop Hartog (born 1946) is a Dutch labour economist and academic

=== Sport ===
- Henri Wijnoldy-Daniëls (1889–1932) was a Dutch fencer, team bronze medallist at the 1920 and 1924 Summer Olympics
- Johan de Kock (born 1964) is a former Dutch football central defender with 449 club caps
- Daniël Mensch (born 1978) is a Dutch rower, team silver medallist at the 2004 Summer Olympics

== See also ==
- Niemandsvriend

== Gallery ==
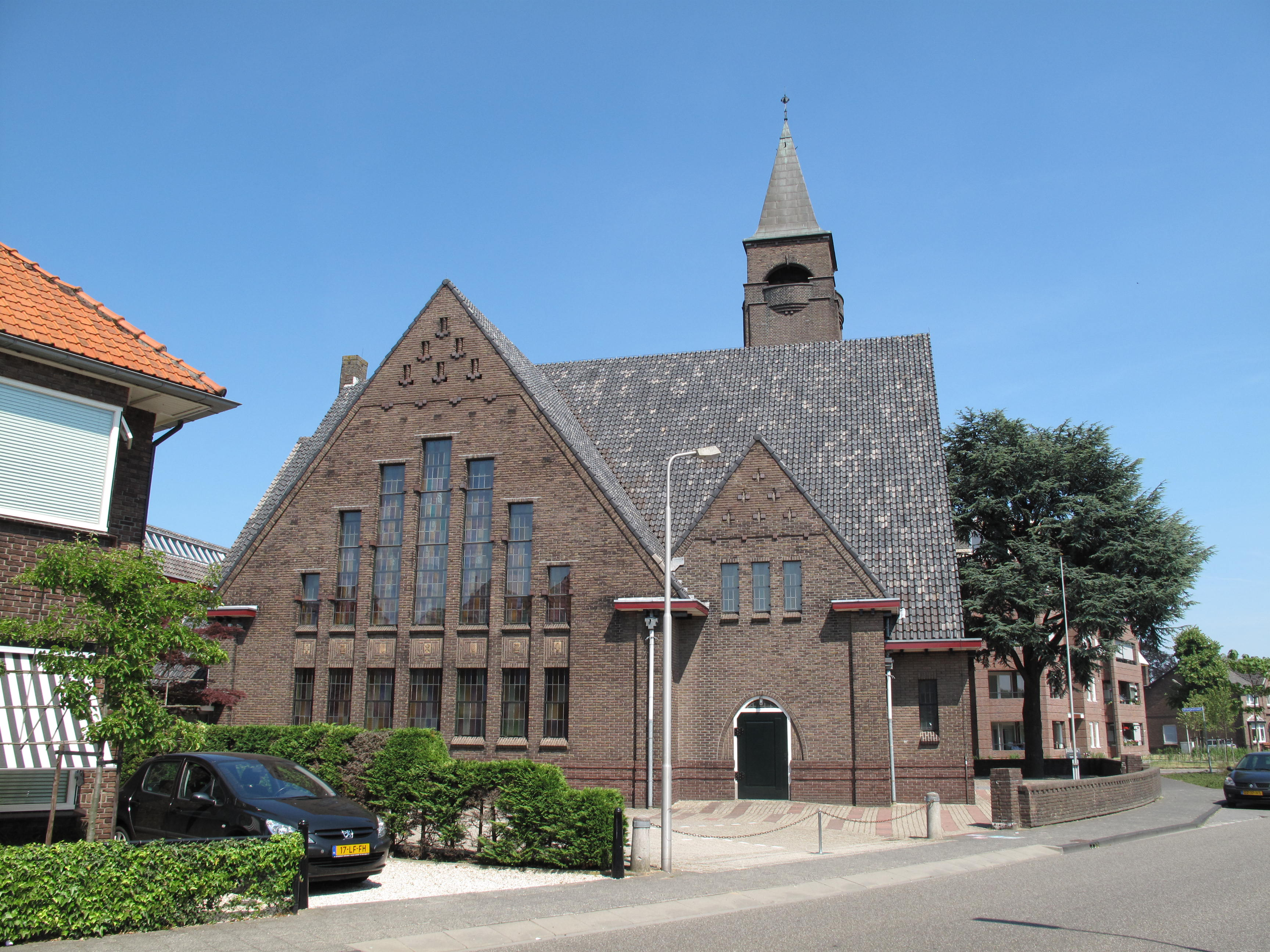
Gereformeerde kerk Sliedrecht

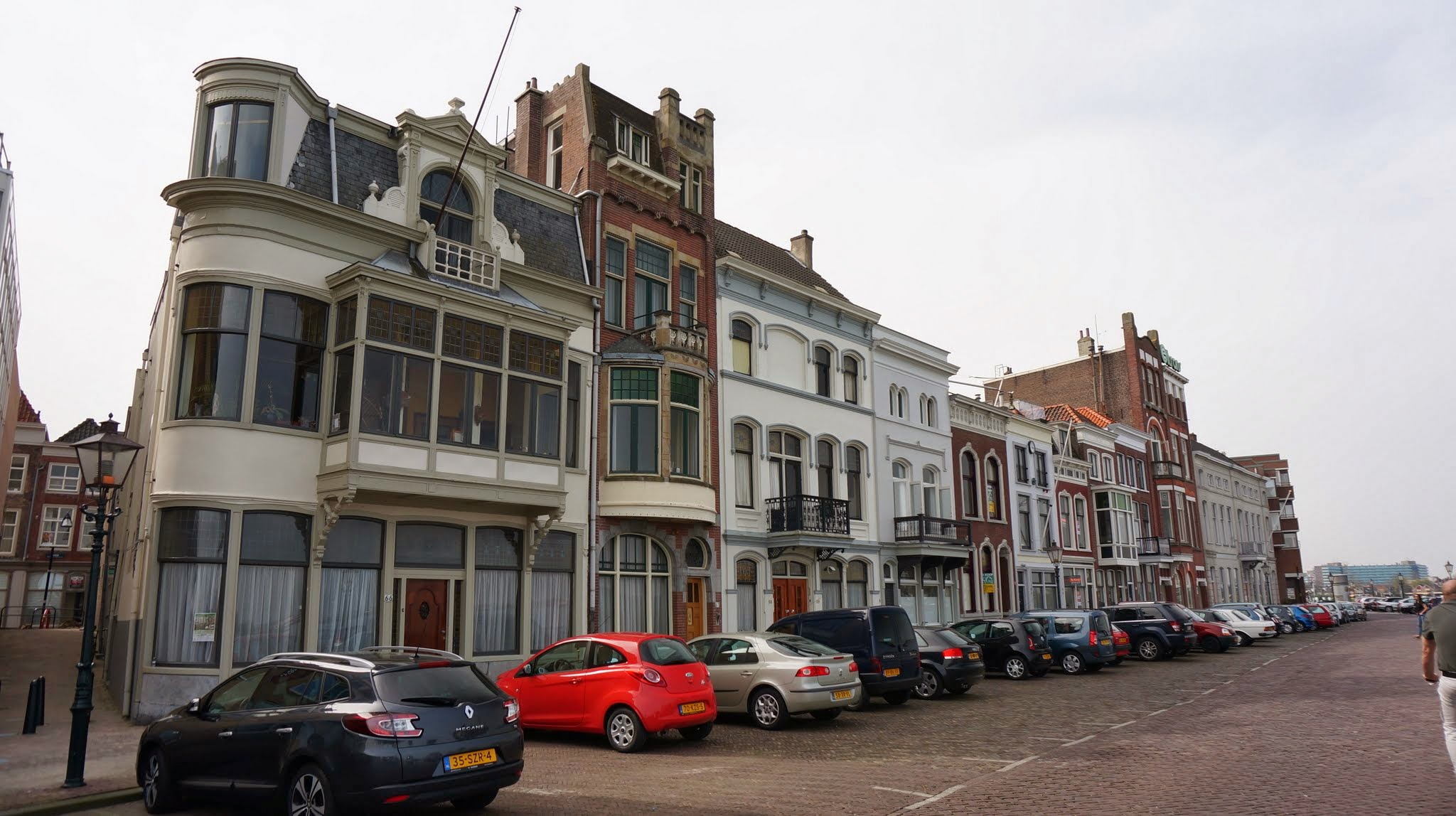
Sliedrecht

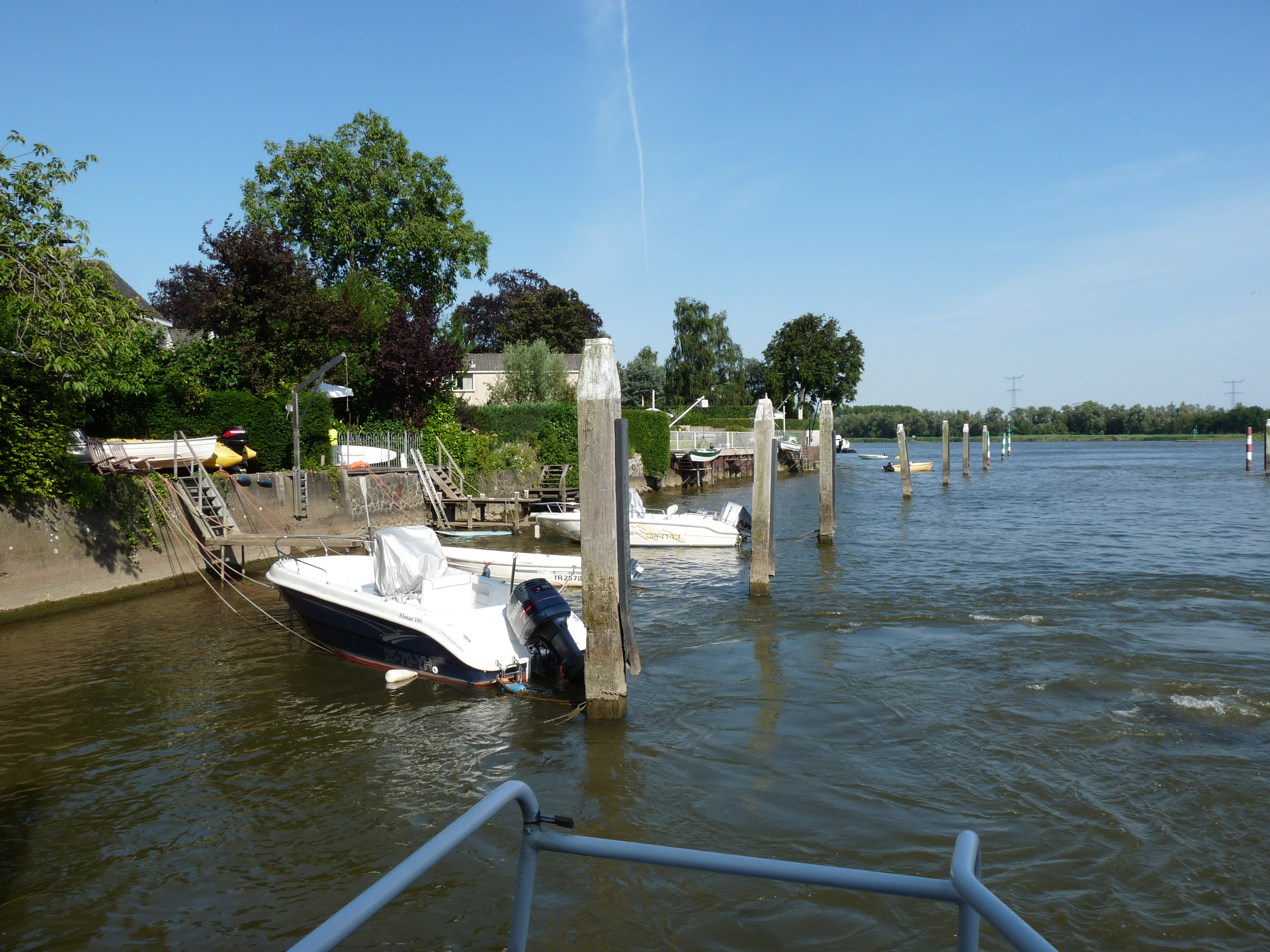
Sliedrecht aan de Beneden Merwede
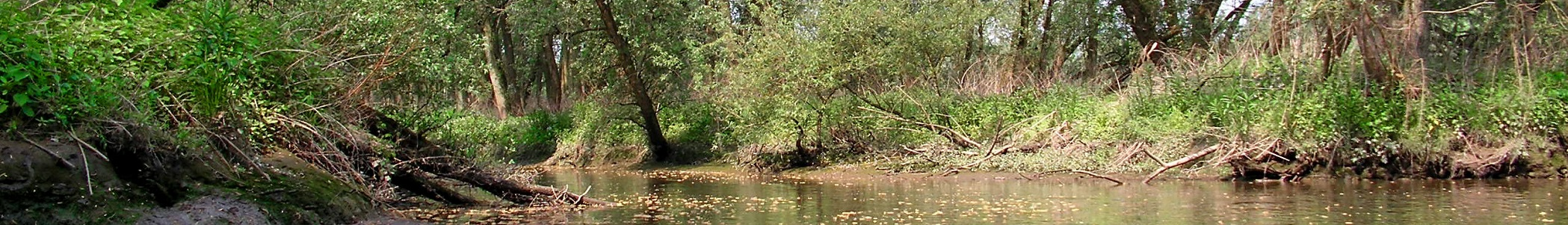
Biesbosch
