= Neman (album) =

Studio album by Klopka Za Pionira
- Released: 2006
- Recorded: 2006
- Genre: Noise, industrial
- Length: 43:22
- Label: Ne-ton
- Producer: Damjan Brkić

Klopka Za Pionira chronology
Planetarni čovek (2006)	Neman (2006)	Kupine (2006)

Neman is an album by the Serbian noise-rock band Klopka Za Pionira, released in 2006 (see 2006 in music) on the Ne-ton independent label. The album's five songs contain no lyrics and are mostly experiments with various noise-making machines that the band was building. The outcome of these experiments can be heard on the following albums, so this was a kind of a showcase of their future work. The songs do not have names, merely numbers that position them on the disk. All of the songs were recorded at once and are first takes and complete improvisations on the spot.

== Track listing ==
All music by Klopka Za Pionira

1. "01" – 7:58
2. "02" – 6:49
3. "03" – 5:53
4. "04" – 9:06
5. "05" – 14:13
