= Niemand hört dich =

2007 album by Panik

Niemand hört dich is the debut album by German crossover / nu metal band Nevada Tan (later renamed to Panik). While critics stated that they were just another teenie-band imitating Linkin Park, the album peaked at number eight on the German albums chart.

== Track listing ==
1. Revolution
2. So wie du (Just Like You)
3. Neustart (New Beginning)
4. Vorbei (Over)
5. Niemand hört dich (Nobody Hears You)
6. Warum? (Why?)
7. Wie es ist (How it is)
8. Alles endet hier (All Ends Here)
9. Dein Echo (Your Echo)
10. Himmel hilf (Heaven Help)
11. Geht ab (Get Out)
12. Ein neuer Tag (A New Day)

== Singles ==
The album has spawned three singles: "Revolution", "Vorbei" and "Neustart".

=== Revolution ===
"Revolution" is the debut single of Nevada Tan. It was released on March 30. A couple of weeks before the single release, there were the first articles about the band in BRAVO. The song is about the revolution of the new generation, represented by Nevada Tan. The video was made in a warehouse, and it shows all six band members as they are more and more overflown by tiny robots coming from everywhere. They let all their anger out in this song, singing how they are sick and tired of rules, and that they want to live their life their own way.

=== Vorbei ===
Vorbei was out on June 8. It is a ballad about a lost love. The video shows the band members as ninjas. They each fight through the pain differently, only Franky sits on the floor and sings. He said in an interview that that's how he deals with love pain in real life. There were Japanese experts in the video who actually fought each other like ninjas.

=== Neustart ===
Neustart was released on August 24. It is T:mo's personal response to his former high school mates he had trouble with. That is probably why he sings most of the text. Franky only sings the chorus. The video was filmed in an underground with over 100 fans holding flashlights.

== DVD: Niemand hört dich - Live ==
A DVD called Niemand hört dich - Live was released on September 28. It features all the songs from the album and a couple of extras. It peaked at #10 of the German DVD charts, mostly thanks to the song "Ein neuer Tag" that promoted the DVD release.

=== Ein neuer Tag ===
"Ein neuer Tag" is a song that promoted the release of the first Nevada Tan DVD. It is a slow song about dealing with the pain when a loved one dies. Franky sings most of the text, while Timo only has one rap-verse. This is the first single where we can hear David playing piano, while Jan's DJing is not heard. The video features much live material. The video could be seen on VIVA's voting show Get the Clip, however it was not released as a single.

== Charts ==
=== Weekly charts ===
Chart (2007)	Peak position
Austrian Albums (Ö3 Austria)	21
French Albums (SNEP)	87
German Albums (Offizielle Top 100)	8
Swiss Albums (Schweizer Hitparade)	63

=== Year-end charts ===
Chart (2007)	Position
German Albums (Offizielle Top 100)	91
