= Amnon Neeman =

Amnon Neeman (born 10 April 1957 in Jerusalem) is an Australian mathematician working in algebraic K-theory, algebraic geometry, topology, and homological algebra. He is professor emeritus at the Australian National University in Canberra and was elected to the Australian Academy of Science in 2005. According to the Academy's citation, his "results on the K-theory of triangulated categories were startlingly original, and completely changed the subject."

In his 2001 research monograph on triangulated categories he proved his version of Brown's representability theorem for triangulated categories, leading to a new proof of Serre–Grothendieck–Verdier duality, a fundamental result in algebraic geometry.

In the course of his investigations of triangulated categories, Neeman constructed new examples of Abelian categories and found a counterexample to a result that had been published by Jan-Erik Roos in 1961.
