= Nyoman Tusthi Eddy =

Balinese writer

Nyoman Tusthi Eddy (December 12, 1945, Pidpid, Karangasem, Bali, Indonesia – January 17, 2020 at age 74) was a Balinese writer who made significant contributions to the literary field in Amlapura. He was particularly known for his dedication to Balinese culture and literature in the eastern region of Karangasem. He wrote poems and articles that were published in newspapers such as Bali Post, Basis, Horison, Kompas, Sarad, Suara Karya, and Warta Hindu Darma. His works also appeared in cultural journals published in Malaysia and Brunei. In 1997, he published a study of the development of Balinese-language poetry during the previous three decades and praised the Bali Post for sponsoring much of this growth.
