= Economics of Education Review =

- Discipline: Education economics
- Language: English
- Edited by: Celeste Carruthers

Publication details
- History: 1981–present
- Publisher: Elsevier
- Frequency: Bimonthly
- Impact factor: 2.238 (2020)

Standard abbreviations
- ISO 4: Econ. Educ. Rev.

Indexing
- ISSN: 0272-7757
- LCCN: 82642752
- OCLC no.: 06933446

Links
- Journal homepage; Online archive

Economics of Education Review is a quarterly peer-reviewed academic journal covering education economics. It was established in 1981 and is published by Elsevier. The editor-in-chief is Celeste Carruthers (University of Tennessee, Knoxville). According to the Journal Citation Reports, the journal has a 2020 impact factor of 2.238.
