= Dirkje Postma =

Dutch pulmonary researcher (born 1951)

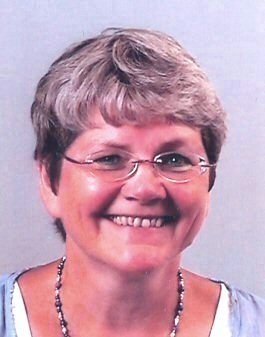
- Born: 1951 (age 74–75); Nij Beets, Netherlands
- Scientific career
- Institutions: University of Groningen

Dirkje "Sjoukje" Postma (born 1951 in Nij Beets, the Netherlands) is a Dutch professor at the University of Groningen and the University Medical Center Groningen. She focused her research career on asthma and COPD. Postma is a member of the Health Council of the Netherlands.

== Career ==
Postma graduated with a degree in medicine in 1978. She specialised in pulmonology. In 1984 she obtained her PhD degree with a thesis entitled Reversibility of chronic airflow obstruction. After graduation, she worked for the Longfonds (then called Astmafonds), a Dutch health organisation. On behalf of this organisation, she became endowed professor at the University of Groningen. In 1998 she got appointed as full professor pathophysiology of the respiration at this university. On 1 April 2016 Postma retired.

Postma's research focusses on asthma and COPD. She co-authored over 600 peer-reviewed papers in journals such asThe New England Journal of Medicine and The Lancet. Because of her research, steroids are nowadays used to mitigate the symptoms of asthma. Her research has been beneficial to millions of people suffering from respiratory illnesses.

One of the results of her research is that asthma and COPD can be distinguished from each other. Postma and co-workers found out that genetic variants occurring in people suffering from allergies also occur in people suffering from asthma and those with a higher risk of myocardial infarctions. These links between these conditions have led to new insights in how to treat those conditions.

== Recognition ==
In 1995, Postma received the Aletta Jacobs Medal. Five years later, she received the Spinoza Prize, the highest academic honour in the Netherlands. In the same year she (as second woman in the Netherlands) joined the Royal Netherlands Academy of Arts and Sciences. In May 2015 she received the prestigious Trudeau Medal from the American Lung Association. She was the first non-American recipient of this honour.

In 2007, the Royal Netherlands Academy of Arts and Sciences awarded her as Akademiehoogleraar and two years later she received the presidential award of the European Respiratory Society.

Postma holds honorary doctorates of the University of Sheffield and Lund University. In her name, the Dutch Longfonds has set up a scholarship for young talents, the Dirkje Postma Talent Award.
