= Dorothea Hilhorst =

Professor of humanitarian studies

Thea Hilhorst

Academic background
- Education: Wageningen Universiteit
- Thesis: Records and reputations : everyday politics of a Philippine development NGO (2000)

Dorothea Johanna Maria (Thea) Hilhorst is a professor of humanitarian studies at the International Institute for Social Studies of Erasmus University in The Hague, The Netherlands.

== Education and career ==
Hilhorst received her Ph.D. from Wageningen University in 2000 with the thesis title Records and Reputations: Everyday Politics of a Philippine Development NGO. She was a professor for humanitarian aid at Wageningen University. As of 2022, Hilhorst was a professor at Leiden University and at Rotterdam. Hilhorst is the president of the International Humanitarian Studies Association.

== Selected publications ==
- D.J.M. Hilhorst, B. Weijs and G. van der Haar (2017, eds) People, Aid and Institutions in Socio-Economic Recovery. Facing Fragilities. London, Earthscan/Routledge
- Jennifer B. Barrett, Margit van Wessel and Dorothea Hilhorst (2016) Advocacy for Development. Effectiveness, Monitoring and Evaluation. E-book, 91 page
- D.J.M. Hilhorst (2013). Disaster, Conflict and Society in Crisis. London and New York: Routledge Humanitarian studies
- G.E.A. Bankoff, G.E. Frerks & D.J.M. Hilhorst (2004). Mapping vulnerability. Disasters, development & people. London: Earthscan
- D.J.M. Hilhorst (2003). The real world of NGOs: Discourses, diversity and development. London: Zedbooks

== Honors and awards ==
Hilhorst received the Spinoza Prize, the highest Dutch scientific prize, in 2022.
