= Jetten =

Jetten is a surname. Notable people with the surname include:

- Jolanda Jetten (born 1970), Dutch social psychologist and a professor at the University of Queensland
- Mike Jetten (born 1962), Dutch professor of Microbiology
- Peter Jetten (born 1985), Canadian professional poker player
- Rob Jetten (born 1987), Dutch politician
