= Jan van Hest =

Dutch chemist

- Born: 27 September 1968 (age 57); Tilburg, The Netherlands
- Education: Eindhoven University of Technology
- Known for: Polymersomes, Artificial cells and organelles, Nanomedicine, Self-assembly
- Awards: 2020 Spinoza Prize
- Scientific career
- Fields: Organic Chemistry; Polymer Chemistry; Materials Science; Nanotechnology
- Workplaces: Eindhoven University of Technology, 2016–present Radboud University Nijmegen, 2000-present DSM Research, 1997-2000
- Thesis: New molecular architectures based on dendrimers (1996)
- Doctoral advisor: Bert Meijer, Roeland Nolte
- Website: https://www.tue.nl/en/research/researchers/jan-van-hest/

Jan Cornelis Maria van Hest (born 28 September 1968) is a Dutch scientist of organic chemistry, best known for his research regarding polymersomes and nanoreactors. He currently holds the position of professor of bioorganic chemistry at Eindhoven University of Technology and is scientific director at the Institute of Complex Molecular Systems. Among the awards he has received, he was one of the recipients of the 2020 Spinoza Prize.

== Biography ==
Van Hest received his MSc degree in Chemical Engineering with distinction from the Eindhoven University of Technology in 1991. He subsequently obtained his PhD in macro-organic chemistry from the same university in 1996 under the supervision of Bert Meijer. His doctoral thesis 'New molecular architectures based on dendrimers' was awarded the DSM Science and Technology award and the SNS Bank Prijs for best thesis in fundamental engineering sciences. In 1996, van Hest received a NWO Talent stipend for a post-doc position on polypeptide engineering at University of Massachusetts Amherst where he collaborated with professor David Tirrell. He returned to the Netherlands to work at DSM Research in 1997 as researcher and later as group leader. Van Hest was appointed as full professor to set up a group in bioorganic chemistry at Radboud University Nijmegen in 2000. His early career focused on developing self-assembling biohybrid block copolymers. In 2010 he was awarded a VICI grant for research on artificial organelles, and in 2016 he obtained an ERC Advanced grant on artificial endosymbiosis. Van Hest moved to Eindhoven University of Technology in 2016, to chair the bioorganic chemistry group at the departments of Chemical Engineering and Biomedical Technology. He was appointed scientific director of the Institute for Complex Molecular Systems (ICMS) at Eindhoven University of Technology in 2018.

To date, van Hest has published over 250 peer-reviewed scientific articles, cited more than 15,000 times and has an h-index of 57.

== Honors and awards ==
Van Hest was elected member of the Royal Netherlands Academy of Arts and Sciences in 2019. He was member of The Young Academy of the Royal Netherlands Academy of Arts and Sciences from 2005 to 2011. Additionally, van Hest is an elected Fellow of the Royal Society of Chemistry (FRSC), a visiting fellow of the Chinese Academy of Sciences, a member of the American Chemical Society, the American Association for the Advancement of Science and the Royal Netherlands Chemical Society.

Listed are some of the prizes awarded to van Hest:

- 2020 – Spinoza Prize
- 2016 – ERC Advanced Grant
- 2013 – Radboud Education Award
- 2012 – Gravitation program (co-recipient)
- 2010 – VICI Award
- 2007 – TOP Grant
- 1996 – NWO Talent Stipend
- 1996 – SNS Bank Prijs
- 1996 – DSM Science and Technology Award

== Professional activities ==
Van Hest served as vice-dean at the Faculty of Science in Nijmegen from 2006 to 2010. He is chairman at the Dutch national postgraduate research school Polymer Technology Netherlands. Van Hest serves as associate editor of Bioconjugate Chemistry. He is furthermore an advisory board member of Macromolecular Bioscience, Journal of Materials Chemistry, and Chemical Science.

Van Hest is a co-founder of the companies, Noviotech, Encapson and Future Chemistry and serves on the scientific board at GATT Tech, Euronol Chemical Technology Center.
