= Yazdanbakhsh =

Yazdanbakhsh is a surname. Notable people with the surname include:

- Maria Yazdanbakhsh (born 1959), Dutch immunologist
- Mir Yazdanbakhsh (1790–1832), Hazaras chieftain in Afghanistan
- Shirin Yazdanbakhsh (1949–2025), Iranian actress
