= Karin Roelofs =

Dutch neuroscientist

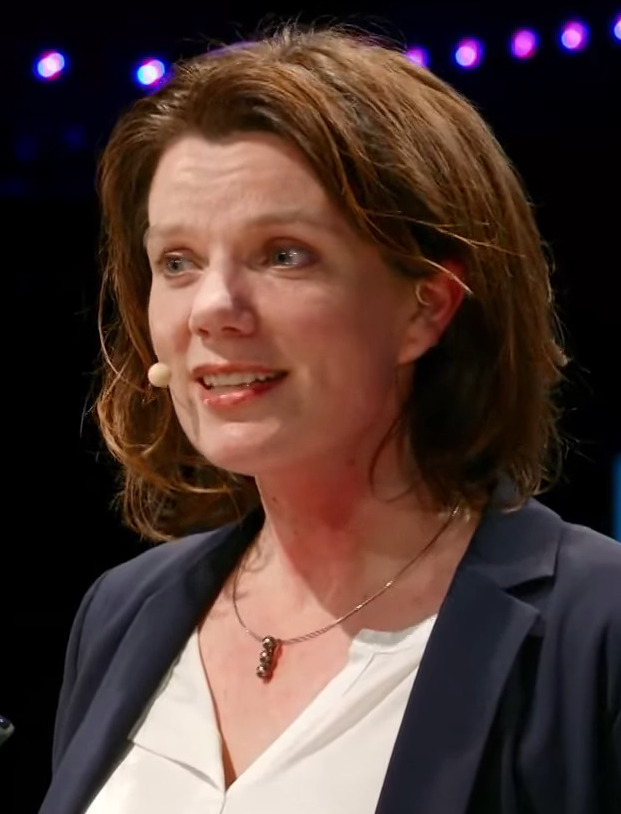
- Roelofs in 2016
- Born: Karin Roelofs; 1972 (age 53–54)
- Education: Radboud University
- Scientific career
- Fields: Cognitive Neuroscience; Affective Neuroscience; Decision Making; Emotion regulation; Psychopathology; Defensive threat responses
- Workplaces: Donders Institute: Donders Center for Cognitive Neuroimaging (DCCN); Behavioural Science Institute (BSI)
- Website: https://www.epanlab.nl/people/karin-roelofs/

Karin Roelofs (born 1972) is a cognitive neuroscientist and clinical psychologist known for her contributions in the fields of stress resilience, decisions making under threat (including the role of defensive freeze reactions in humans), and neurocognitive mechanisms of emotion regulation in health, professionals at risk and patients with stress-related disorders. Currently she holds the position of Professor of Experimental Psychopathology at the Behavioural Science Institute (BSI) and is chair of the Affective Neuroscience group at the Donders Institute for Brain Cognition and Behaviour (DI), Radboud University Nijmegen (RU) in The Netherlands. Roelofs received three consecutive grants by the European Research Council (ERC) and the Spinoza prize (2026) for her research and is a member of the Royal Netherlands Academy of Arts and Sciences.

== Education and career ==
Roelofs obtained her master's degree in Neuropsychology and Clinical Psychology at Radboud University. For her Neuropsychology degree she interned at the Pediatric Branch NCI: National Institutes of Health (NIH) in Bethesda, USA. She completed her Ph.D. in 2002 at Radboud University, with the highest distinction (Cum Laude) and became assistant professor at the Department of Clinical Health and Neuropsychology at Leiden University (LU). During this time, she also held part-time positions as a registered GZ-Psychologist at Rivierduinen, Leiden and at PsyQ, Den Haag. In 2007 she was promoted to associate professor at the Leiden Institute for Brain and Cognition (LIBC). Following her tenure at Leiden University, she made a transition in 2010 to Radboud University as a full professor of Experimental Psychopathology at the Behavioural Science Institute (BSI) & Donders Institute: Centre for Cognitive Neuroimaging (DCCN). It was there that she founded the EPAN group, known as "Experimental Psychopathology and Affective Neuroscience".

== Research ==
Roelofs is an expert in affective neuroscience and stress-related disorders. She has provided the empirical foundations of current theorizing about the role of human defensive stress-reactions in long-term resilience. Her group's longitudinal studies in risk populations have contributed to the identification of biomarkers for stress-resilience. Additionally, she is developing neurocognitively grounded interventions to train stress-resilience and decision making under threat, of which one is currently implemented in the curriculum of the Dutch Police Academy. Roelofs' theoretical paradigm opened new scientific directions, moving from a focus on stress vulnerability towards a focus on understanding resilience. She was awarded the prestigious international Evens Science Prize for outstanding neuroscientific contributions to the field of stress-resilience.

== Awards and recognition ==
Roelofs holds various international positions. She is member of the Research Council of the ERC (2026-2030) and board member of the European federation of academies of sciences and humanities: All European Academies (ALLEA), dedicated to the advancement of science and scholarship in Europe and the world. She is founding member and former chair (2022–2024) of the International Resilience Alliance (INTRESA), founding member and former vice-president (2020–2025) of the (AERG), member of the Academia Europaea and member of the Royal Netherlands Academy of Arts and Sciences (KNAW).

Karin Roelofs has received several grants throughout her career. A selection of personal and consortium grants:

- 2026 Spinoza Prize
- 2025-2030 European Research Council (ERC-AdG) Advanced Grant. Primary applicant: HEART2ADAPT: Autonomic Balance for Adaptive Decision Making
- 2025-2033 Dutch Research Council (NWO) national science agenda (NWA-ORC grant). Co-applicant (PI: Klumpers): CONTEXT: Contextualized Biofeedback training for professionals and youth at risk
- 2023 Dutch Research Council (NWO) take-off grant. Primary applicant: DUST platform (Decision under threat training), a biofeedback-based VR game.
- 2021-2027 Dutch Research Council (NWO) open competition SHH. Role applicant together with Ivan Toni: Control mechanisms of social-emotional regulation (406.20.GO.020)
- 2020-2027 Dutch Research Council (NWO) Crossover Grant. Role WP-leader: INTENSE: Innovative Neurotechnology for Society.
- 2013-2019 Dutch Research Council (NWO): Vici personal grant, for "The role of freeze-fight-flight tendencies in post traumatic stress"
- 2018 European Research Council (ERC-CoG) Consolidator Grant. Primary applicant: DARE2APPROACH: A Neurocognitive Approach to Alleviating Persistent Avoidance in Anxiety Disorders (772337)
- 2017-2024 Horizon2020 Personalized Medicine grant. Co-applicant (PI: Kalisch): DYNAMORE: Dynamic modelling of resilience (777084777084)
- 2013-2017 European Research Council (ERC): FP7-HEALTH-2013-INNOVATION (co-applicant)
- 2017-2023 Dutch Research Council (NWO): Brain and Cognition Grant
- 2012-2018 European Research Council (ERC-StG) starting grant: NEURODEFENSE: Neural control of human freeze-fight-flight
- 2007-2013 Dutch Research Council (NWO): Vidi (advanced postdoc) personal grant
- 2004-2007 Dutch Research Council (NWO): Veni (postdoc) personal grant

== Public engagement ==
Roelofs regularly gives public lectures, several of which are publicly available: "The Resilient Human Being" (in Dutch: De veerkrachtige mens) as part of the Dies Natalis event at Radboud University; "What causes you to freeze, flee or fight when you feel threatened?" ( in Dutch: Wat zorgt ervoor dat je verstijft, vlucht of juist vecht als je je bedreigd voelt?) was recorded as part of public lecture series of the University of the Netherlands (in Dutch: de universiteit van nederland); and "Grensverleggen is... logisch" organized by the Ministry of Defense of the Netherlands (in Dutch: Ministrie van Defense); and a lecture on Veerkracht as part of the Radboud Reflects lecture series.

Roelofs' work has been featured in several television programs and documentaries: The Evens Foundation Price video, Radboud Brain Awareness Week, "Martijn is Angry!" ( in Dutch: Veilig Verkeer Nederland: Martijn is Boos!). VPRO-Labyrint and Katja's body scan.

Her work has been covered in newspapers and magazines, including the annual magazine of the Dutch Research Council (NWO): Results of 2022, NeurolabNL, European Commission Horizon (online magazine), NWO.

She also engaged in educating teachers and primary school children in research skills, including workshops, lectures and a book on science for primary schools.

Additionally, Roelofs' expertise has been sought in media interviews, including discussions on funding for fundamental research, the effects of stress on young children, and emotion regulation in psychopaths. Lastly, her lab's efforts have been featured in numerous articles and radio segments in the Netherlands and Belgium.

== Representative publications ==
- Bramson, Bob; Meijer, Sjoerd; van Nuland, Annelies; Toni, Ivan; Roelofs, Karin (2023). "Anxious individuals shift emotion control from lateral frontal pole to dorsolateral prefrontal cortex". Nature Communications. 14 (1): 4880. Bibcode:2023NatCo..14.4880B. doi:10.1038/s41467-023-40666-3. ISSN 2041-1723. PMC 10423291. PMID 37573436.
- Roelofs, Karin; Bramson, Bob; Toni, Ivan (2023). "A neurocognitive theory of flexible emotion control: The role of the lateral frontal pole in emotion regulation". Annals of the New York Academy of Sciences. 1525 (1): 28–40. Bibcode:2023NYASA1525...28R. doi:10.1111/nyas.15003. hdl:2066/292767. ISSN 0077-8923. PMID 37170478.
- Roelofs, Karin; Dayan, Peter (2022). "Freezing revisited: coordinated autonomic and central optimization of threat coping". Nature Reviews Neuroscience. 23 (9): 568–580. doi:10.1038/s41583-022-00608-2. hdl:2066/251259. ISSN 1471-0048. PMID 35760906.
- Kaldewaij, Reinoud; Koch, Saskia B. J.; Hashemi, Mahur M.; Zhang, Wei; Klumpers, Floris; Roelofs, Karin (2021). "Anterior prefrontal brain activity during emotion control predicts resilience to post-traumatic stress symptoms". Nature Human Behaviour. 5 (8): 1055–1064. doi:10.1038/s41562-021-01055-2. ISSN 2397-3374. PMC 7611547. PMID 33603200.
- Bramson, Bob; den Ouden, Hanneke EM; Toni, Ivan; Roelofs, Karin (2020). Shackman, Alexander; Ivry, Richard B (eds.). "Improving emotional-action control by targeting long-range phase-amplitude neuronal coupling". eLife. 9 e59600. doi:10.7554/eLife.59600. ISSN 2050-084X. PMC 7591252. PMID 33106222.
