= Jozien Bensing =

Dutch university teacher and psychologist (1950–2026)

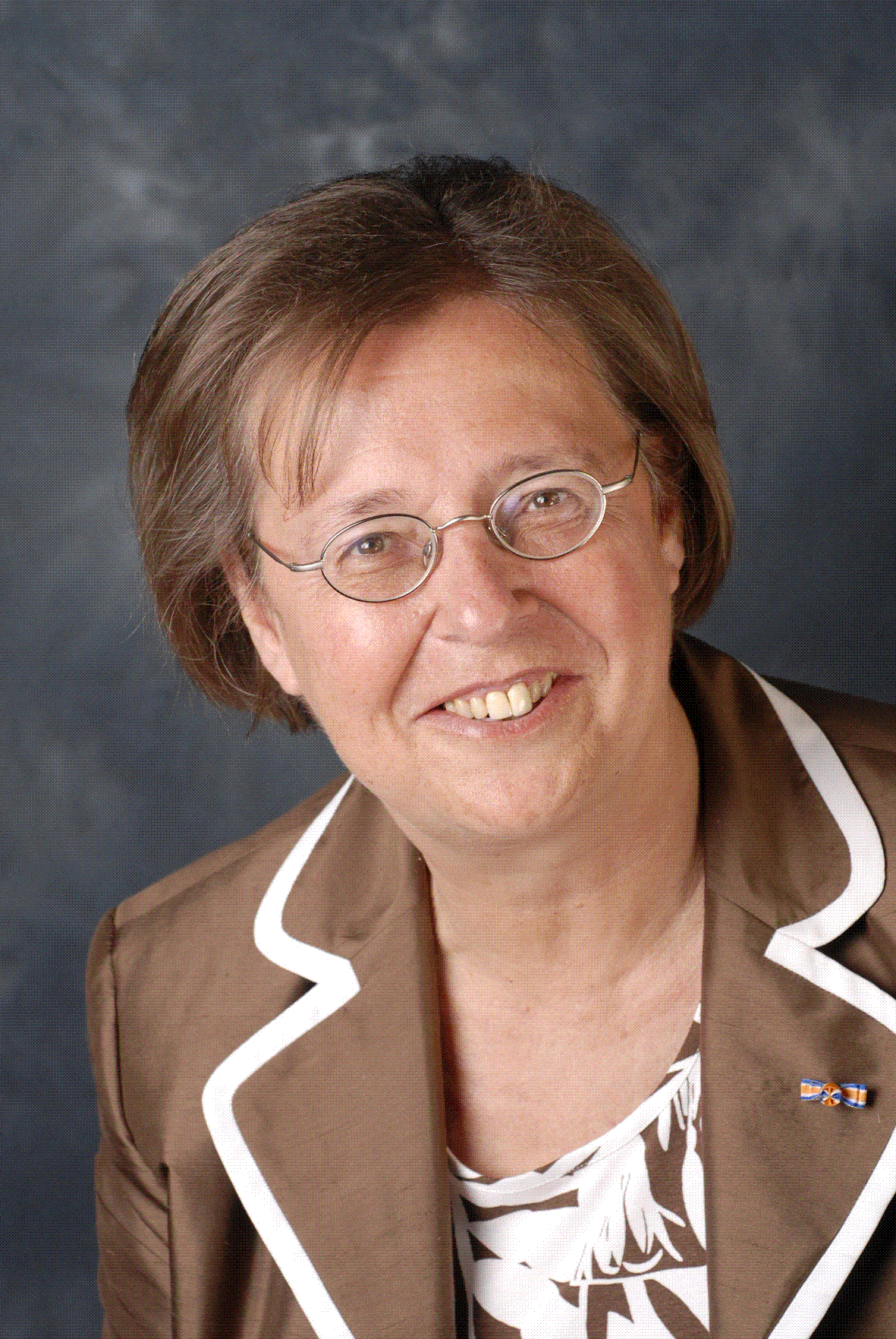
- Bensing in 2007
- Born: Josina Maria Bensing; 12 March 1950; Tilburg, Netherlands
- Died: 1 June 2026 (aged 76)
- Education: Utrecht University; Erasmus University Rotterdam (PhD, 1991)
- Known for: Research on doctor–patient communication
- Awards: George Engel Award (2003); Spinoza Prize (2006); Order of Orange-Nassau (Officer, 2004); Order of the Netherlands Lion (Knight, 2015)
- Scientific career
- Fields: Clinical psychology, healthcare psychology
- Workplaces: Nederlands Instituut voor Onderzoek van de Gezondheidszorg|nl (NIVEL); Utrecht University
- Thesis: Doctor-patient communication and the quality of care. An observation study into affective and instrumental behavior in general practice (1991)

Josina Maria "Jozien" Bensing (12 March 1950 – 1 June 2026) was a Dutch clinical psychologist. She was director of the Nederlands Instituut voor Onderzoek van de Gezondheidszorg (NIVEL) between 1985 and 2008. From 1993, Bensing was a professor of clinical and healthcare psychology at Utrecht University. She was a winner of the 2006 Spinoza Prize.

== Life and career ==
Bensing was born in Tilburg on 12 March 1950. She studied clinical psychology at Utrecht University. Bensing obtained a PhD at the Erasmus University Rotterdam in 1991, her thesis was titled: "Doctor-patient communication and the quality of care. An observation study into affective and instrumental behavior in general practice".

In 1974, Bensing started as a researcher at the Dutch Institute for General Practice (Dutch: Nederlands Huisartsen Instituut). Two years later she became leader of the project "Psycho social care in general practice". She kept this position for a further two years and in 1979 became the head of the research department. In 1984, she became acting director. The next year the Dutch Institute for General Practice became the Nederlands Instituut voor Onderzoek van de Gezondheidszorg (NIVEL) and Bensing became the director. She served in this position until 2008 and then continued as an honorary research fellow. Apart from her work at NIVEL Bensing has been a professor of clinical psychology and healthcare psychology at Utrecht University since 1993. Between 1996 and 1998, she served as dean of the faculty.

Her research focused on the role of communication in doctor-patient relations. Her research also has links to the placebo effect. She has done research on large quantities of video recorded conversations between doctors and patients and has built a database of over 16,000 entries.

Bensing died on 1 June 2026, at the age of 76.

== Awards and honours ==
Bensing was awarded the George Engel Award by the American Academy on Physician and Patients in 2003, and was the first non-American to obtain it.

In 2006, she was one of four winners of the Dutch Spinoza Prize and received a €1.5 million grant. The awarding commission cited her "multidisciplinary research into the communication between doctors and patients, and her internationally used research method for quantifying non-verbal communication".

Bensing was elected a member of the Royal Netherlands Academy of Arts and Sciences in 2007.

In 2004, Bensing was named an Officer in the Order of Orange-Nassau. In 2015 she was made a Knight in the Order of the Netherlands Lion.
