= Willem Meindert de Vos =

Dutch academic and microbiologist

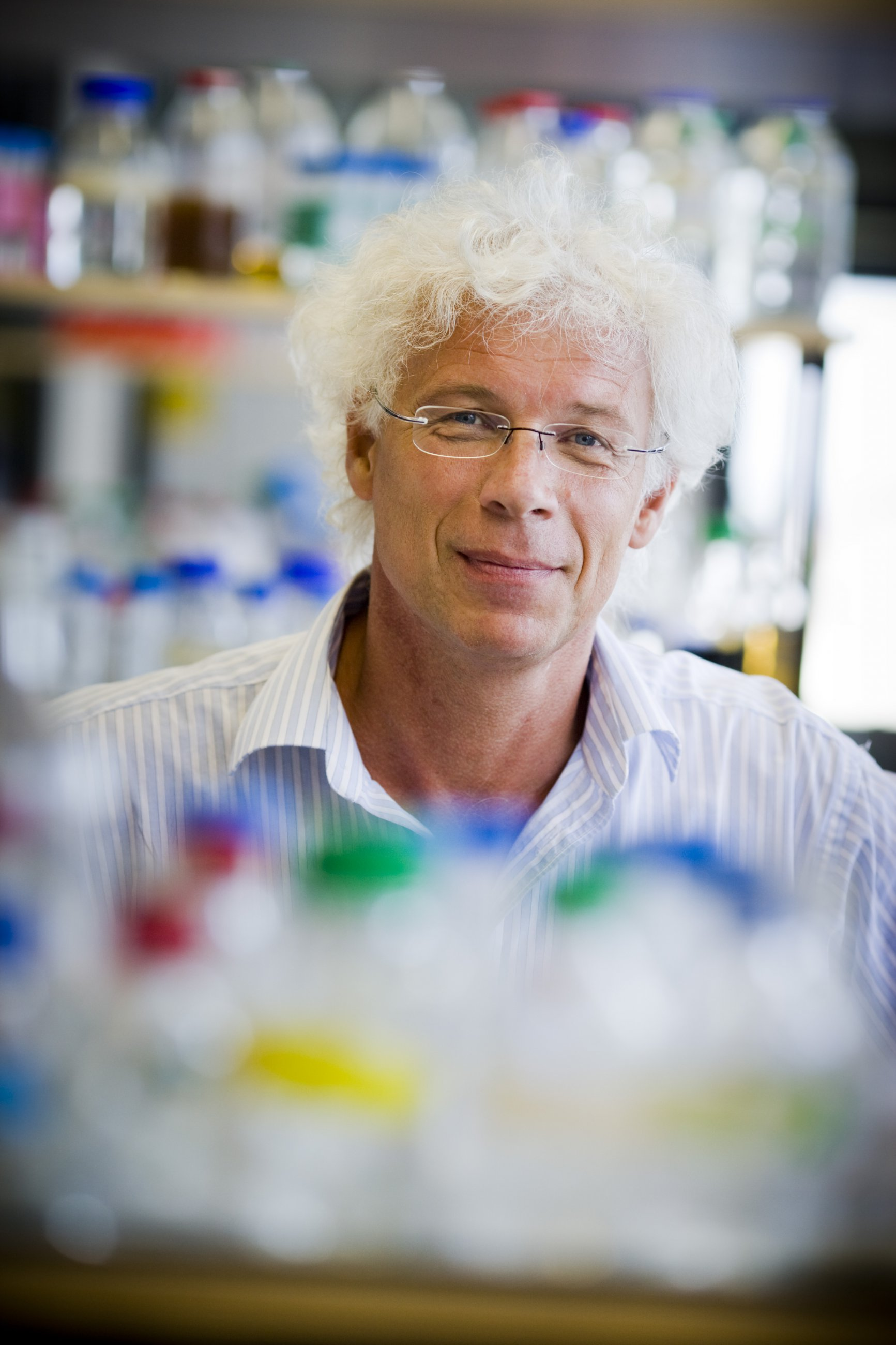
Willem de Vos (2008)

Willem M. de Vos (born 30 October 1954, in Apeldoorn) is a Dutch academic and microbiologist. He studied for his PhD at the University of Groningen. He is notable for winning the Spinozapremie in 2008. De Vos is currently serving as an Academy Professor for the Academy of Finland.

Since 2009 De Vos is member of the Royal Netherlands Academy of Arts and Sciences.
