= Dirk Bouwmeester =

Dutch physicist

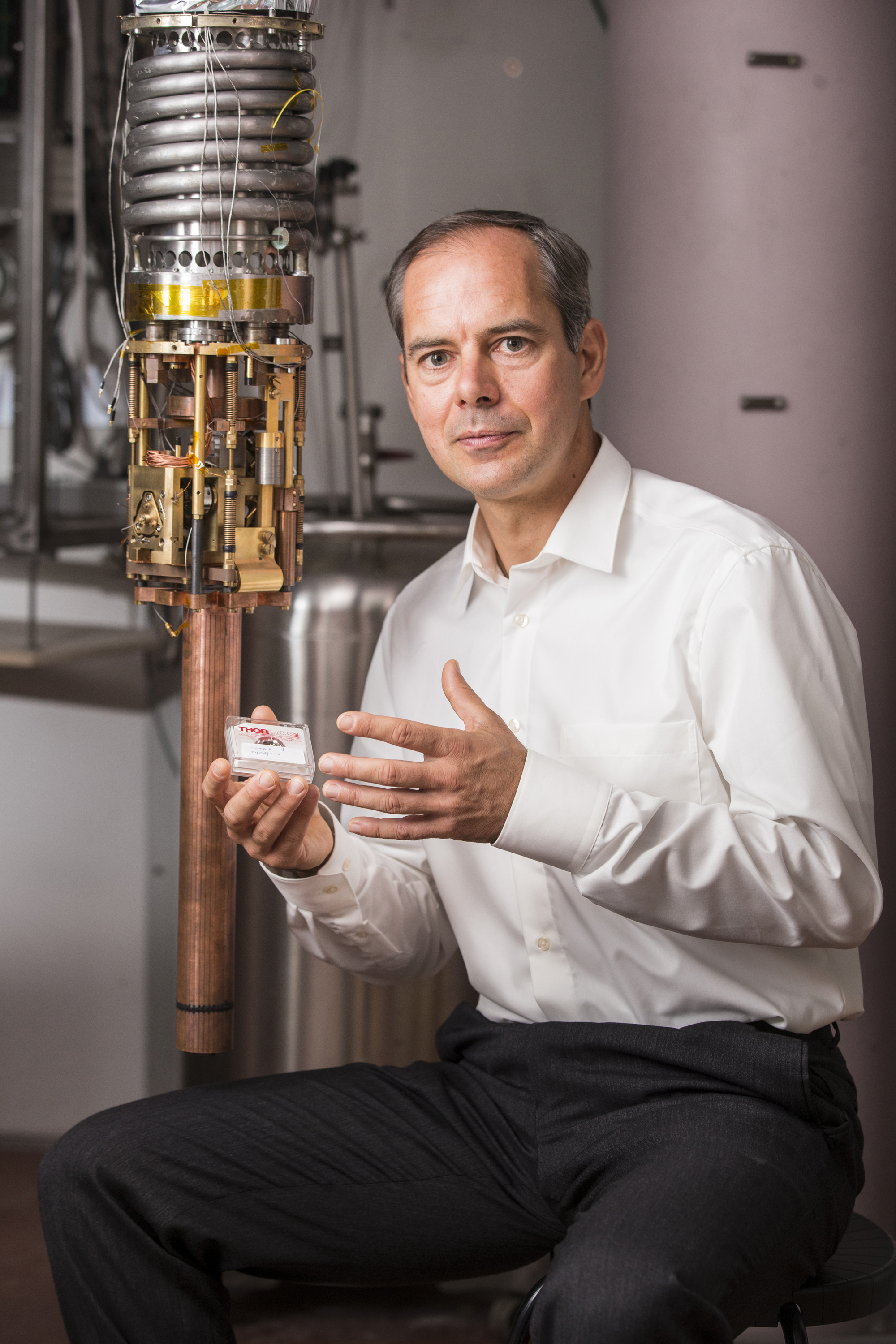
Dirk Bouwmeester (2014)

Dirk (Dik) Bouwmeester (born 1967) is a Dutch experimental physicist specializing in quantum optics and quantum information. He currently holds faculty positions at the University of California at Santa Barbara and at Leiden University in the Netherlands.

In 1995 he obtained his PhD in Johannes P. Woerdman's lab at Leiden University with the thesis Quantum mechanics and classical optics. The next year, while he was a post-doctoral researcher in the group of Anton Zeilinger, he performed one of the first demonstrations of quantum teleportation using photons. His current areas of research include solid-state cavity quantum electrodynamics, knotted states of light, micro-optomechanical systems, and DNA-templated optical emitters.

He was awarded the 2014 Spinoza Prize, the highest scientific award in the Netherlands.
