= Els Goulmy =

Dutch biologist

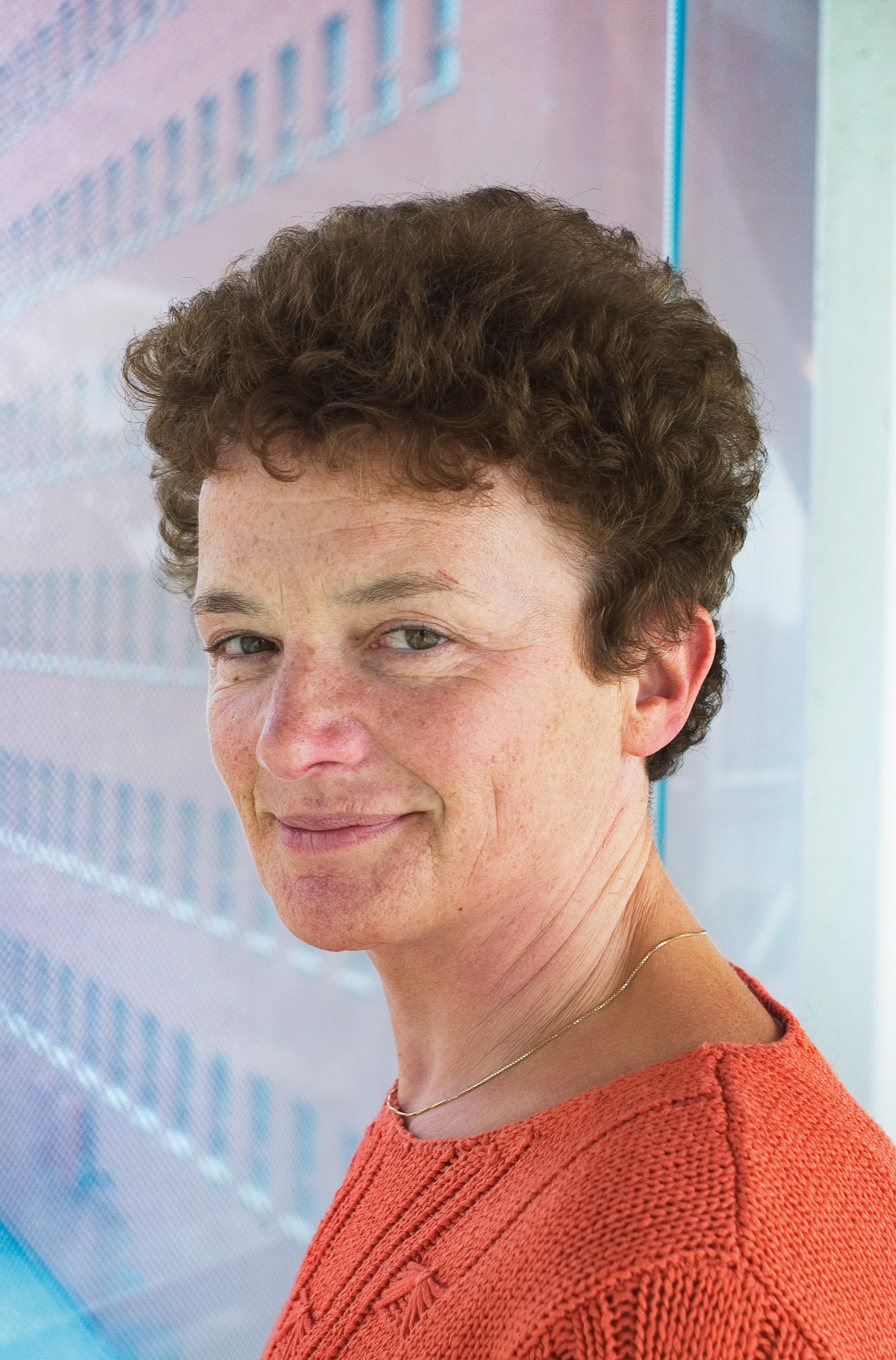
Els Goulmy (2002)

Els Goulmy (born 27 November 1946, The Hague) is an eminent professor of transplantation biology, especially regarding minor histocompatibility antigen, at Leiden University. Goulmy is an expert in the area of tissue typing and belongs internationally to the absolute top of her discipline. She was awarded the Spinoza Prize in 2002.

== Research ==
Goulmy did groundbreaking research on the role of antigens in organ and stem cell transplantation. She is the pioneer of the so-called Minor Transplantation Antigens in men. Minor antigens can induce strong immune reactions. She discovered the H-Y minor antigen encoded by the Y-chromosome (1976) and the autosomally encoded HA-1 antigen (1983). She then described the polymorphism and the population frequencies of several autosomal minor antigens. Crucial was her work on the differential expression of minor antigens showing either overall expression on all body cells, such as the male specific H-Y antigens, or restricted expression on solely blood and blood cancer cells, such as HA-1. Goulmy was the first to describe the chemical structure of the human minor antigens (1995). In 1996 she demonstrated the crucial role of minor antigens in the outcome of organ and stem cell transplantation. In 1997 she launched new concepts for immunotherapy of blood cancer applying the blood and cancer cell specific minor antigens, such as HA-1, for tumor specific treatment. The basis for the translation 'from the lab to the clinic' of these cancer and patient specific treatment was laid in her laboratory. Hereby minor antigens, such as HA-1, are used as 'vaccin' to boost the anti-blood cancer reaction in the patients' body.

== Career ==
Els Goulmy has a remarkable career. After secondary school and an education for laboratory technician, she worked as a clinical-chemical technician in Nijmegen, Switzerland and Norway. In 1972 she started as research technician at the University Hospital in Leiden in the department of Jon van Rood. Goulmy has a Master en Immunology (cum laude 1984) and a Doctorat d'Etat es Sciences Naturelles (summa cum laude 1985) of the Paris University 'Paris VI Pierre et Marie Curie'. In 1990 she worked as visiting scientist in the Department of Cell Biology of the Stanford University School of Medicine (USA). Goulmy wrote over 250 scientific articles among which several in Nature and Science. For her scientific pioneering work, she received nationally and internationally more than a dozen prices and awards among which the Spinoza Prize of the Netherlands Organization of Scientific Research. Goulmy was active in many national and international scientific advisory committees, among which the KNAW, the European Research Council and Institut Pasteur. Goulmy was one of the founders of the Dutch Network of Women Professors (2001) and their president from 2001-2012. (Landelijk Netwerk Vrouwelijke Hoogleraren). She is a member of the Royal Holland Society of Sciences and Humanities (KHMW).

Since November 11, 2011 Goulmy is an emeritus professor. Following her farewell speech, she was honoured with the distinction 'Knight in the order of the Netherlands Lion'.
