= Ben Scheres =

Dutch developmental biologist

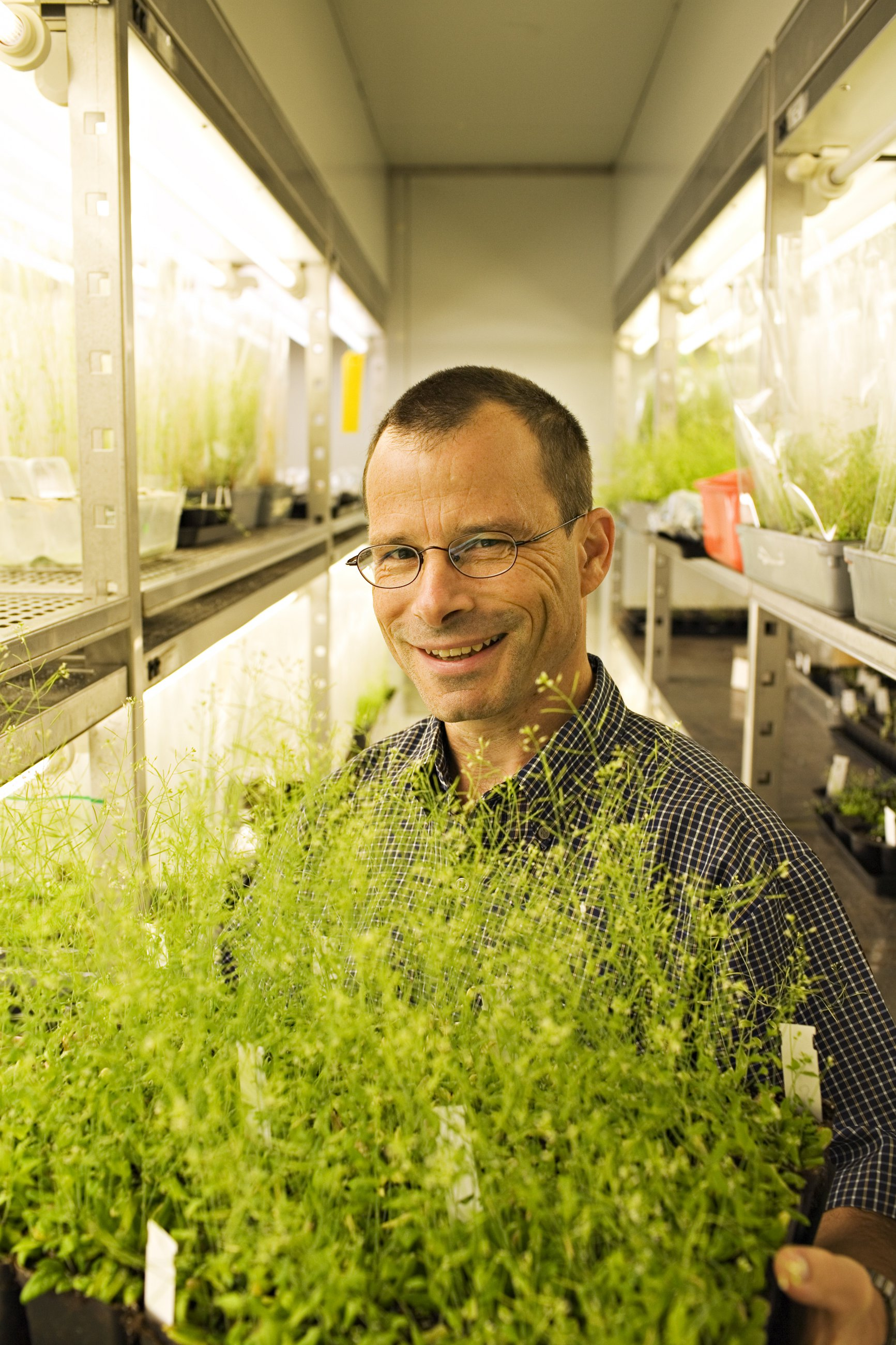
Ben Scheres (2006)

Bernardus Johannes Godefridus Scheres (Ben) Scheres (born 10 July 1960 in Echt) is a Dutch developmental biologist. He is Professor of Plant Developmental Biology at Wageningen University.

Scheres studied phytopathology at Wageningen University, where he received his doctorate in 1990. After a post-doctoral period at the Laboratory of Genetics in Ghent, he became a lecturer at the University of Utrecht, where he became Professor of Plant Developmental Biology in 1999 and Professor of Molecular Genetics in 2005.

Scheres studies the developmental biology of plants and compares them to that of animals, discovering many similarities. He used the thale cress as a test plant. Among other things, he discovered the role of stem cells in the growth and shape development of roots. He specifically switched off individual cells with a laser and blocked individual genes in order to explore their role in development.

In 2000 he received the Siron Pelton Prize from the American Botanical Society. In 2004 he became a member of the Royal Netherlands Academy of Arts and Sciences. In 2006 he received the Spinoza Prize. In 2007 he was elected to the European Molecular Biology Organization. He received the prize for young chemists from the Dutch research organization NWO.
