= Bas van Bavel =

Dutch historian

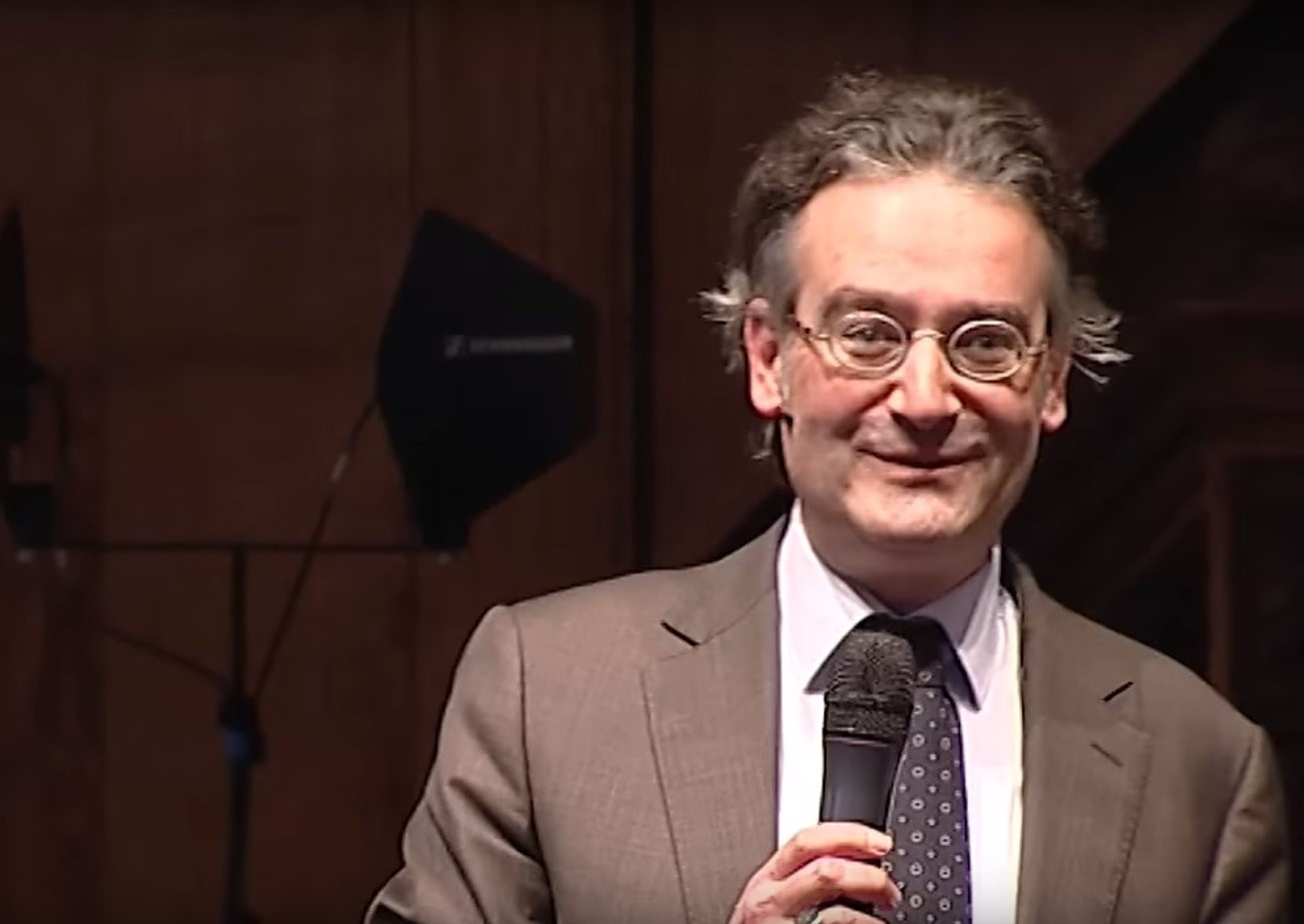
Bas van Bavel (2013)

Balthassar Jozef Paul "Bas" van Bavel (born 24 June 1964) is a Dutch historian. He has held the chair of Transitions of Economy and Society at Utrecht University since 2011, and has been a professor of Economic and Social History since 2007. His research has mostly focused on pre-industrial Northwestern Europe. He was one of the winners of the 2019 Spinoza Prize, the highest award in Dutch science.

== Career ==
Van Bavel was born on 24 June 1964 in Breda. He obtained an MA in history at Utrecht University in 1988, and continued at the university as a post-graduate, gaining his PhD in 1993. From 1993 to 1995 Van Bavel was a university lecturer at Utrecht University and the University of Amsterdam. He then worked as a research fellow at the Royal Netherlands Academy of Arts and Sciences until 1998. In 1999 he returned to the University of Amsterdam as postdoctoral researcher funded by the Netherlands Organisation for Scientific Research (NWO). Between 2001 and 2008 he led a research project on 'The organisation of markets in late medieval Holland', and between 2007 and 2012 he led a project on 'Economic growth and stagnation in the pre-industrial era: Iraq, Italy and the Low Countries, 600-1700', both at Utrecht University and funded by the NWO. He was appointed as professor of Economic and Social History of the Middle Ages by Utrecht University in 2007. Furthermore, in 2007 he became the academic coordinator for the Utrecht University focus area “Origins and Impacts of Institutions”, which developed into the Utrecht University strategic theme Institutions for Open Societies in 2012, for which he became the programme director. Between 2011 and 2014 he served as head of the section Economic and Social History of the Department of History. In 2014 he was appointed as professor Transitions of Economy and Society and started directing a research team for the project 'Coordinating for life. Success and failure of Western European societies in coping with rural hazards and disasters, 1300–1800'.

Van Bavel was active for football club NAC Breda from 2002 onwards. Between April 2010 and April 2011 van Bavel was its board chairman.

== Research ==
The majority of van Bavel's research has focused on pre-industrial Northwestern Europe especially on the divergent development of societies and the influence of institutions on this process. In more recent research he has also included other parts of Europe and the Middle East, while also including more recent history.

Van Bavel has argued that gross domestic product is a subjective manner of representing economic growth and strength, and is not an objective analysis. He also criticizes using it, as it only shows a partial view of the quality of life experienced. He has argued for the encompassing of social factors - such as equity and welfare, and the resilience to shocks and disasters - and ecological factors - such as sustainable use of resources.

In an article published in Past & Present in 2009, van Bavel and Oscar Gelderblom disagreed with British historian Simon Schama on the origins of historic Dutch cleanliness. While Schama argued that it was founded in Calvinism and patriotism, van Bavel and Gelderblom argued that it originated for economic reasons, hygiene being necessary for the production of cheese and butter.

In 2014 van Bavel contributed to a report on economic disparity published by the Dutch Scientific Council for Government Policy. He called the increased disparity in personal capital between 2008 and 2013 "quite shocking" (the capital of the wealthiest 1% had increased from about the same as the least owning 20%, to around 25%).

== Honors, awards and grants ==
In 2001 van Bavel was awarded a VIDI grant from the Netherlands Organisation for Scientific Research (NWO) for the research project 'The organisation of markets in late medieval Holland'. In 2006 van Bavel won a VICI grant from the NWO for the research project 'Economic Growth and Stagnation in the Pre-Industrial Era: Iraq, Italy and the Low Countries, 600-1700'. In 2013 van Bavel was awarded a European Research Council Advanced grant for the research project 'Coordinating for life. Success and failure of Western European societies in coping with rural hazards and disasters, 1300–1800'.

Van Bavel was elected a member of the Royal Netherlands Academy of Arts and Sciences in 2013. The Academy praised his research for providing a new perspective on the economic history of the Middle Ages. He was elected a member of the Academia Europaea in 2016.

In 2019, Van Bavel was named one of the four laureates of the Spinoza Prize. The awarding institution, the Netherlands Organisation for Scientific Research, praised Van Bavel for: "providing an entirely new vision on the role of the market economy in our society."

== Works ==
- Bavel, Bas van. Manors and Markets: Economy and Society in the Low Countries, 500–1600, New York: Oxford University Press, March 2010.
- Bavel, Bas van. The Invisible Hand? How Market Economies have Emerged and Declined since ad 500, Oxford: Oxford University Press, July 2016.
