= René Janssen =

Dutch chemist and educator

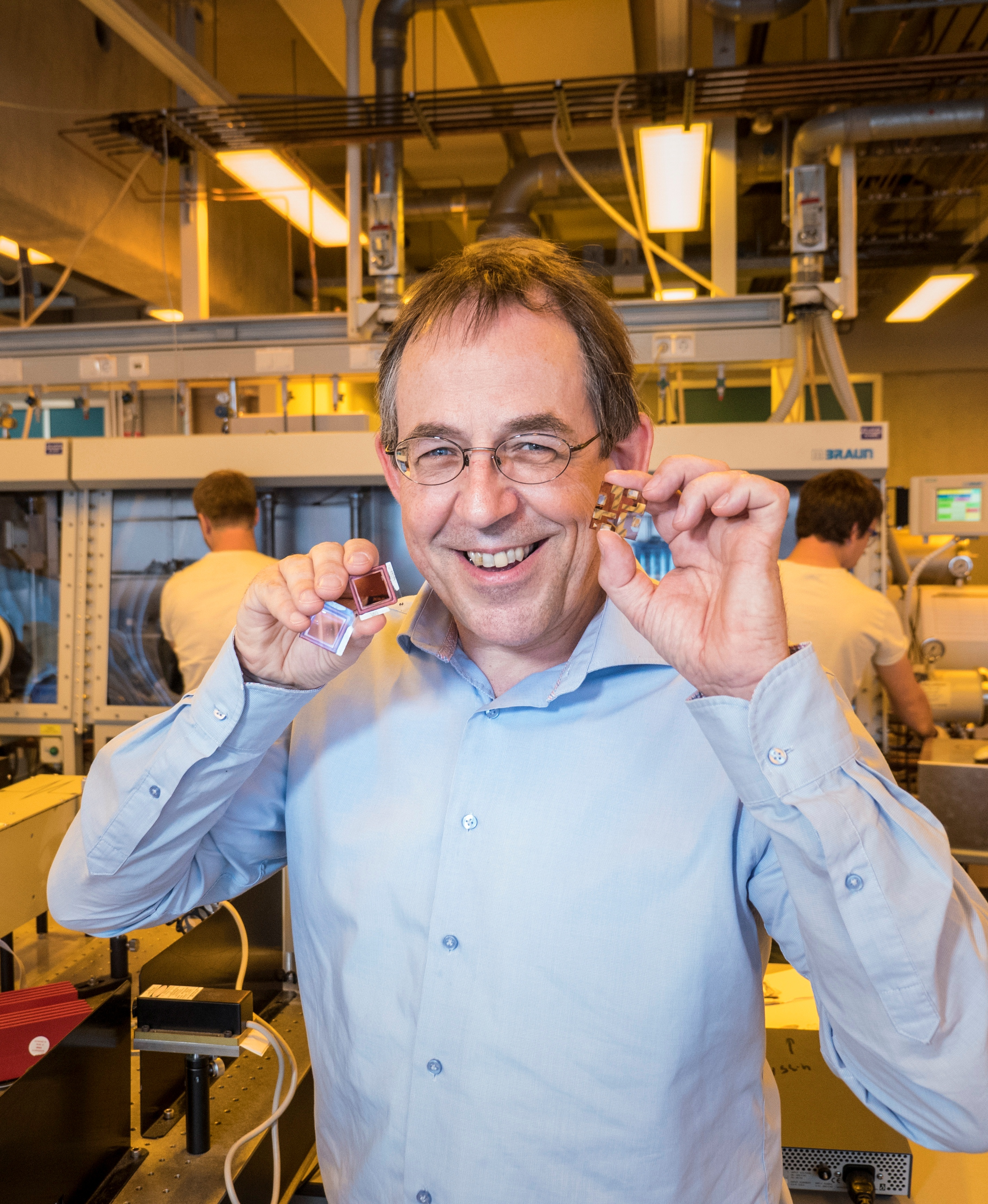
René Janssen (2015)

René A.J. Janssen (born 1959 in Roermond, Netherlands) is a Dutch chemist who is Professor of the Moleculair Materials and Nanosystems group (M2N group) within the department of Chemical engineering and Chemistry at Eindhoven University of Technology.

In 2013 Janssen won a 2.5 million euro grant by the European Research Council to develop methods to produce solar energy systems at a lower cost.

In 2015 he was one of four winners of the Dutch Spinoza Prize. Part of Janssen's research focuses on plastic solar cells and the storage of solar energy in solar cells.

Since 2011 Janssen is member of the Royal Netherlands Academy of Arts and Sciences.
