= Eveline Crone =

Dutch professor of cognitive neuroscience

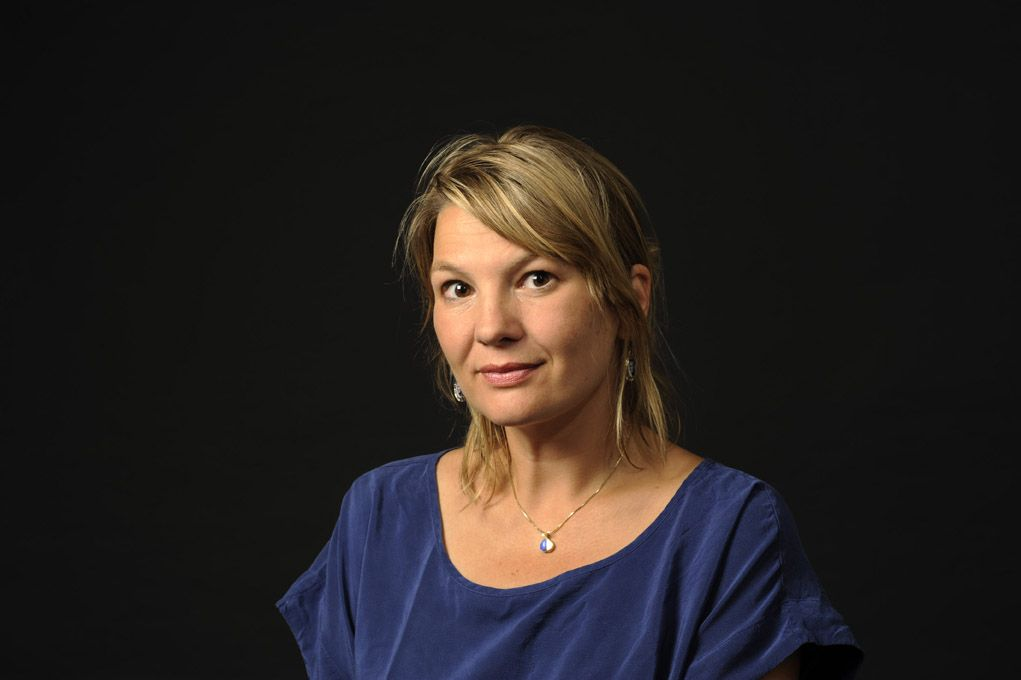
- Born: October 23, 1975 (age 50); Schiedam, Netherlands
- Education: University of Amsterdam (M.A., Ph.D.)
- Children: 2
- Awards: Spinoza Prize (2017)
- Scientific career
- Fields: Developmental psychology
- Workplaces: Leiden University; University of Amsterdam; University of California, Davis
- Thesis: Performance monitoring and decision-making: Psychophysiological and developmental analyses (2003)
- Doctoral advisor: Maurits van der Molen

Eveline Crone (born 23 October 1975) is a Dutch professor of cognitive neuroscience and developmental psychology at Leiden University. Her research focuses on risky behaviors in adolescent humans during puberty and examines the function of those risks. For her research in adolescent brain development and behaviour, she was awarded the Spinoza Prize, the highest recognition for Dutch scientists, in 2017.

== Life and career ==
Crone was born on 23 October 1975 in Schiedam, Netherlands. In high school, her curiosity about other people and their motivations led to her interest in psychology. For her post-graduate education, she spent a year-long internship at the University of Pittsburgh from 1997 to 1998, where she first developed a fascination with research on the brain after witnessing the first neuroimaging studies including young children were performed. In 1999, she received a master's degree from the University of Amsterdam in developmental psychology. In 2003, she graduated cum laude in the same field and from the same university with her doctorate thesis, Performance monitoring and decision-making: Psychophysiological and developmental analyses. This thesis received multiple awards. She then spent two years working as a post doctoral associate at the Center for Mind and Brain at the University of California, Davis.

In 2005, Crone took a position as an assistant professor in the Department of Developmental Psychology at Leiden University, rising to associate professor in 2008. In 2009, she became a full professor of Neurocognitive Developmental Psychology at Leiden and also of Neurocognitive and Affective Adolescent development, at her alma mater, the University of Amsterdam, where she would work until 2014. At Leiden, she founded the Brain and Development laboratory in 2005. From its research, this lab "[offers] reference points for adapting education and society to adolescents’ capacities."

== Research ==
Crone's research focuses on risky behaviors in adolescent humans during puberty and examines the function of those risks. She uses functional magnetic resonance imaging and various other scientific techniques to examine brain processes in adolescent brains. She characterizes adolescence as a "useful development phase in which the brain learns to deal with a larger social environment," as opposed to a necessary evil. In The Netherlands, her work has led to policy changes: a modification of the Youth Detention Act extended the age limits for juvenile prisons from 18 to 23. However, she maintains that, though she offers her knowledge, she must abstain from policy and value judgements and her research must not be influenced by values.

She was awarded the VICI grant from the Netherlands Organisation for Scientific Research in 2015, and the Consolidator Grant from the European Research Council in 2016.

== Awards and honors ==
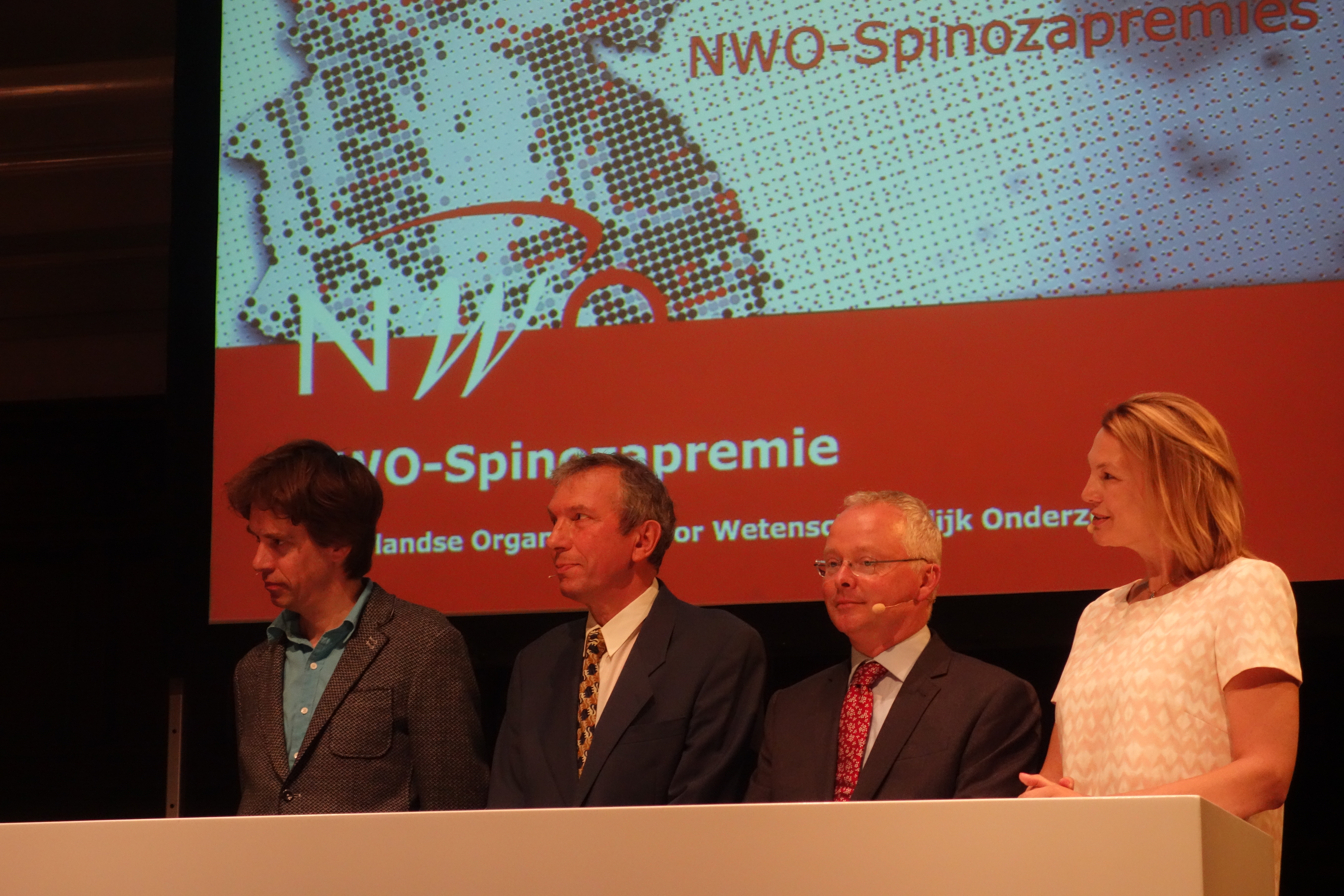
The winners of the 2017 Spinoza Prize; Crone is at far right

In 2017, Crone was named one of the four winners of the Spinoza Prize. In interviews, she stated that she would use the prize money to continue her research on risk taking in the adolescent brain and to connect investigations on identity, altruism, and social media usage in young adults.

Crone is also the recipient of the Huibregtsen Prize for Science and Society by the Dutch Minister of Education in 2009; the Early Career Award from the Society for Psychophysiological Research in 2011; and the Ammodo Science Award from the Royal Netherlands Academy of Arts and Sciences in 2017. In 2021 she was elected a corresponding fellow of the British Academy.

== Publications ==
Outside of research, Crone makes frequent appearances in various forms of media. In 2008, Crone published her first book, Het puberende brein. Her second book, Het sociale brein van de puber, was published in 2012. She also collaborated with communication experts to publish a website for adolescents where they could find information about their developing brains. In 2016, she and documentary producer Erik Heuvelink created the film Braintime: Discovering the developing brain, which portrayed interviews from the namesake study's researchers and young participants alongside the study's results. She gave a TEDx Talk in Amsterdam on "The rebellious teenager" in 2011.

== GUTS ==
She initiated the GUTS (Growing Up Together in Society) research program, funded by the Ministry of Education, Culture, and Science with 22 million euros. This 10-year program (2023-2032) has the ambition to understand how youth grow up in a complex society.

== Memberships and affiliations ==
In 2013, Crone was elected to the Academia Europaea and the Royal Dutch Society of Sciences and Humanities. In 2013 she was also elected to the Royal Netherlands Academy of Arts and Sciences after she had been a member of The Young Academy, where she had been a chair, since 2008. The Netherlands' National Network for Women in Science has given her one of their top achievement awards, and she has published over 150 well-cited articles in scientific journals.

== Personal life ==
Crone is the mother of two children; her husband works a three-day week, which she states allows her to work full-time. With some colleagues from Leiden University, she founded an organization, Athena's Angels, which aims to make visible and then correct the problems experienced by women who work in science. On the subject of these problems, Crone states, "It is difficult to deal with it as an individual. That is why it is important that women help each other. Create a network, and – just keep going".

== Bibliography ==
=== Books ===
- Het puberende brein (2008)
- Het sociale brein van de puber (2012)

=== Films ===
- Braintime: Discovering the developing brain (2016)
