= Marijn Franx =

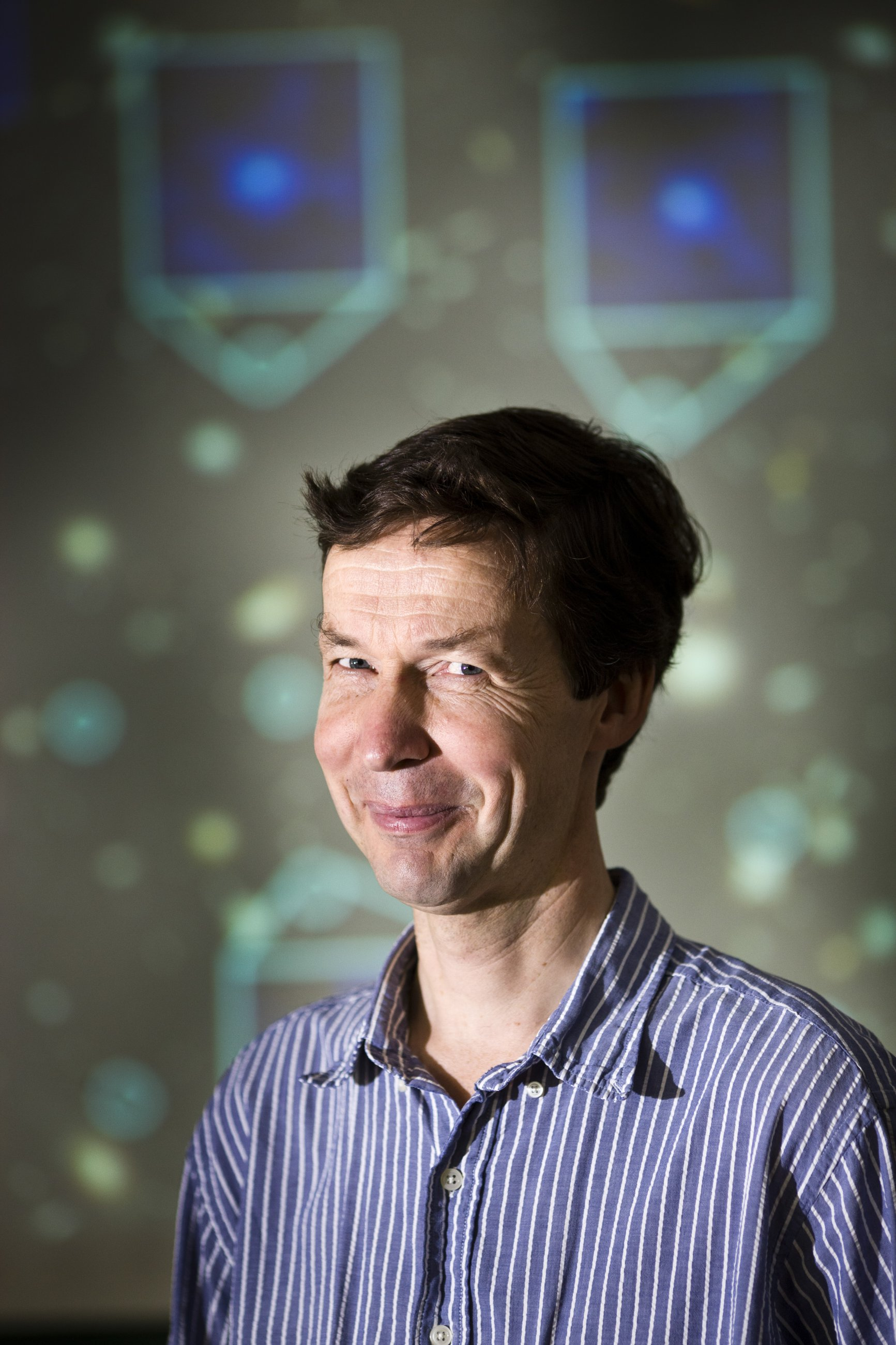
Marijn Franx (2010)

Marijn Franx (born 24 September 1960) is a Dutch professor of astronomy at Leiden University. He was a winner of the 2010 Spinoza Prize. His research focuses on the formation and evolution of galaxies. He is involved with both the Hubble and James Webb Space Telescopes.

== Career ==
Franx was born on 20 July 1960 in Eindhoven. He studied astronomy at Leiden University and graduated cum laude in 1984. Four years later he obtained his doctorate from the same university. From 1988 to 1991 Franx was a Junior Fellow of Harvard University. In 1991 he became a Hubble Fellow. Between 1993 and 1998 he was professor of astronomy at the University of Groningen, he then moved to Leiden University where he has held the same position since.

In 2008 Franx received a European Research Council Advanced grant of 1.5 million euro. He is member of the Royal Netherlands Academy of Arts and Sciences since 2009.

In 2010 he was one of four winners of the Dutch Spinoza Prize and received a 2.5 million euro grant. The awarding organisation, the Netherlands Organisation for Scientific Research, praised Franx for being the lead Dutch scientist to use the Hubble Space Telescope and his research on the formation and evolution of galaxies. Franx is the only Dutch scientist to work on the successor to the Hubble Space Telescope, the James Webb Space Telescope.

In March 2016 it was announced that a team of researchers, including Franx, had discovered the farthest galaxy thus far, located at 13.4 billion lightyears.
