= Piek Vossen =

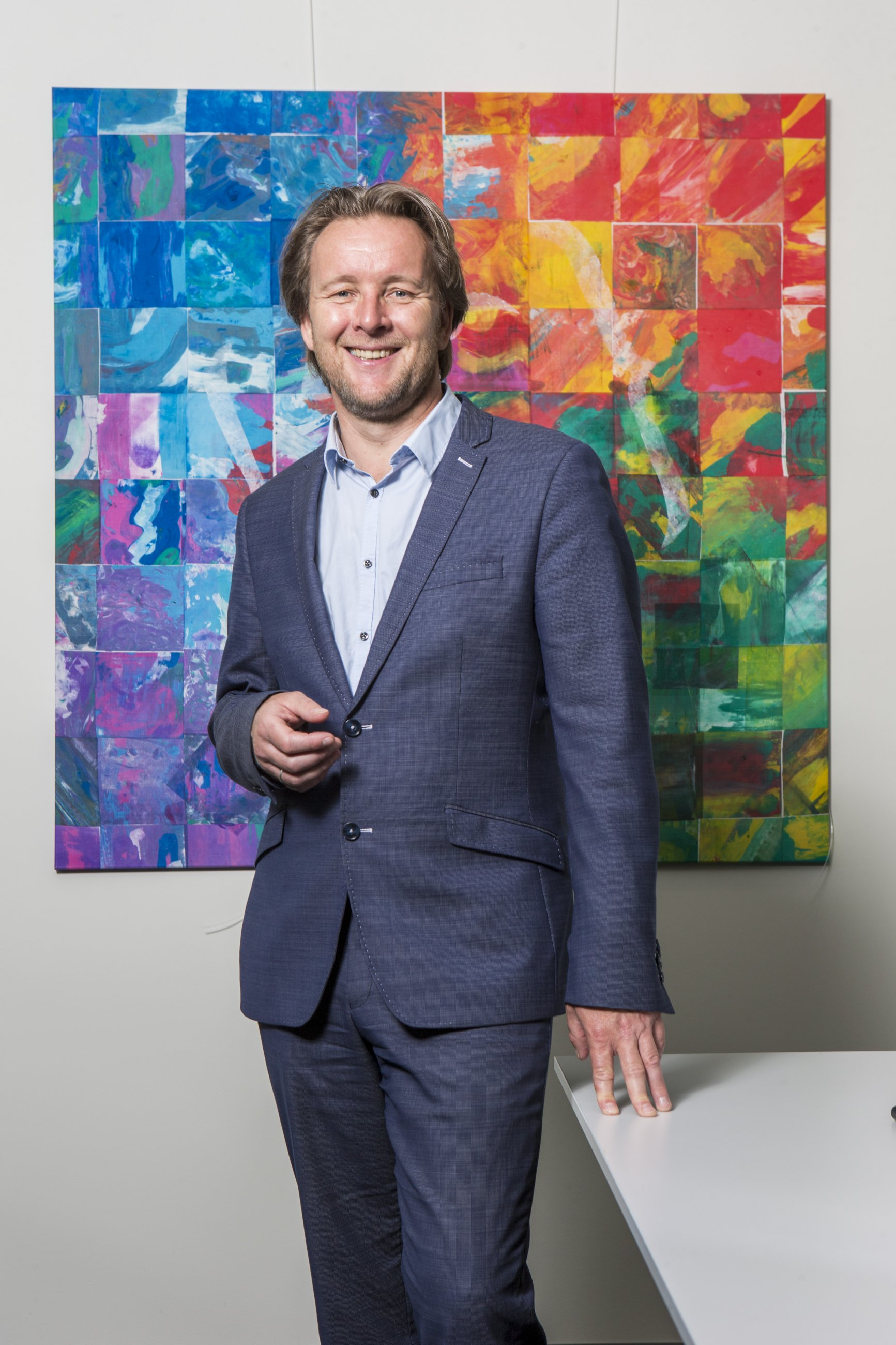
Piek Vossen (2013)

Piek Th. J. M. Vossen (born 1960 in Schaesberg, the Netherlands), is professor of computational lexicology at the VU University Amsterdam, head of the Computational Lexicology & Terminology Lab, and founder and president of the Global WordNet Association.

== Education ==
Vossen graduated from the University of Amsterdam in Dutch and general linguistics and obtained a PhD (cum laude) in computational lexicology in 1995 at the same university.

== Awards ==
Vossen is a recipient of the 2013 Spinoza Prize and a winner of the "Enlighten Your Research"-competition 2013 with the project "Can we Handle the News".

Vossen was elected a member of the Royal Netherlands Academy of Arts and Sciences in 2017.
