= Lans Bovenberg =

Dutch economist (born 1958)

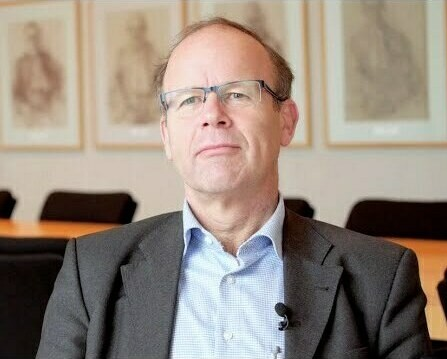
- Born: June 15, 1958 (age 68); Oosterbeek, Netherlands
- Education: University of California, Berkeley (Ph.D.); Econometric Institute drs., MSc Econometrics and Operations Research
- Known for: Population aging Environmental economics Public finance Life Course Saving Scheme
- Awards: Spinoza Prize (2003); Honorary Doctorate from University of Ghent (2008)
- Scientific career
- Fields: Public Economics
- Workplaces: Netspar; Tilburg University
- Doctoral advisor: Laura Tyson

Arij Lans Bovenberg (born June 15, 1958) is a Dutch economist, and Professor of Economics at the Tilburg University and Erasmus University, known mainly due to his contribution to the Dutch debate on population ageing, pension reforms and public finances. Lans Bovenberg was awarded the Spinoza Prize in 2003.

== Biography ==
Bovenberg was born and raised in Oosterbeek in the Netherlands. Between 1976 and 1981 he studied econometrics at the Erasmus University. Teun Kloek supervised his MSc thesis (doctoraalscriptie) From 1981 to 1984 he studied at the University of California, Berkeley. He obtained his PhD in economics there at the end of 1984 for the dissertation entitled Capital Accumulation and Capital Immobility: Q-theory in a Dynamic General Equilibrium Framework.

After graduation he lived in the US, working at the International Monetary Fund. In 1990 he returned to the Netherlands and after a brief period at the Ministry of Economic Affairs he became a professor of economics at the Tilburg University and Erasmus University. Between 1995 and 1998 Bovenberg was deputy director at the Bureau for Economic Policy Analysis. Since April 2004 he has been scientific director of research institute Netspar, which he has founded.

Bovenberg is an independent member of the Dutch government's Social-Economic Council's committee for Social-Economic Policy and Life-Course Policy. In 2003 he won the Spinoza Prize, which allowed him to start the Netspar research institute. Also thanks to these activities he was declared to be one of the 100 most influential Dutchmen by HP/De Tijd magazine in 2007. In 2008 Bovenberg got an honorary doctorate by the University of Ghent, Belgium for his scientific contributions. In 2009 he was elected member of the Royal Netherlands Academy of Arts and Sciences. Bovenberg was elected member of Academia Europaea in 2010.

== Work ==
The early work of Bovenberg focussed on tax competition in open economies. Later he contributed on optimal taxes and environmental economics. Most recently he focussed on population ageing and pension economics.

=== Population ageing and pension ===
In the area of population ageing and pension Bovenberg advocates more flexible employment contracts, which would allow employees to combine work with care duties and lifelong learning. To keep older workers in the labor force, he suggests to offer them more vacation and shorter working hours.

He is the architect of the Dutch Life Course Saving Scheme, which allows workers to save parts of their income to finance longer period of leave.

=== Labour Participation ===
In 2008 Bovenberg was a member of the Commission Labour Participation, led by P. Bakker. The commission advised the Dutch government on how to increase labor force participation in the Netherlands to 80%.

=== Christian Democratic Appeal ===
Bovenberg believes that people have to be given incentives to make full use of their capacities and that people also have duties, not only rights. He argues that also disadvantaged social groups should be expected to participate to work. He is often considered to be a Christian Democratic Appeal ideologist, but he himself states that his view (partly) differs from those of the party in some areas. Together with other Dutch economists like Johan Graafland and Eric van Damme, he thinks about the connection between Christian thinking and economics.

== Personal ==
Lans Bovenberg is married and father of two children. He was originally a member of the Reformed Churches in the Netherlands. When he lived in the United States, he was touched by the faith and the practical living of evangelic Christians. When he returned to the Netherlands he became a Pentecostal.

He is a member of the charismatic Evangelic Church Jefta in Breda, which is a part of the Pentecostal denomination Rafael Nederland. Twice a year he preaches in his church. He plans to study theology and become a part-time preacher around 2013.
