= Nynke Dekker =

Dutch academic and biophysicist

Nynke Hester Dekker
- Born: 2 April 1971 (age 55)
- Education: Leiden University; Yale University; Harvard University
- Awards: EPS Emmy Noether Distinction (2013); Spinoza Prize (2020)
- Scientific career
- Workplaces: Kavli Institute of Nanoscience; Delft University of Technology; École normale supérieure University of Oxford
- Thesis: Guiding atoms on a chip (1999)
- Website: Dekker Lab

Nynke Hester Dekker (pronounced [ˈniŋkə ˈɦɛstər ˈdɛkər]; born 2 April 1971) is a Dutch biophysicist who since 2024 has been Professor of Biophysics at the Department of Physics, University of Oxford. Before this she was Professor of Molecular Biophysics at the Kavli Institute of Nanoscience at Delft University of Technology. Dekker studies individual DNA and RNA molecules and how they interact with proteins in bacteria, viruses and eukaryotes. She described how virus proteins build errors into the virus RNA of viruses. In 2020, she was awarded the Spinoza Prize.

== Early life and education ==
Dekker, daughter of a United Nations staff member, was born in Amsterdam. She studied physics and applied mathematics in the United States. In 1993, she received her bachelor's degree from Yale University where she worked alongside Mark A. Reed in applied physics. She was a graduate student at Leiden University, where she graduated in physics. In 1996, she received her master's degree in atomic physics from Harvard University. At Harvard, she completed her doctorate in nanotechnology, designing microchips that contained caesium atoms. She moved to Paris as a postdoctoral researcher at the École normale supérieure.

== Research and career ==
In 2002, Dekker moved to Delft University of Technology, where she was made full professor in 2008. Her research considers fundamental biological processes. Cellular function involves DNA replication, a robust biological mechanism with a low error rate. Dekker looks to understand the action of molecules and proteins essential for cellular processes (e.g. copying and translating DNA, repairing errors). Her early work investigated the enzyme Type I topoisomerase, which is involved in the replication of DNA and RNA.

Dekker has developed a broad range of single-molecule techniques and nanoanalytical probes, including magnetic and optical tweezers and nanopores. In particular, she developed new capabilities for optical tweezers, including the ability to measure torque.

Dekker spent 2015 on sabbatical at the Francis Crick Institute, where she decided to switch focus to the complex biomolecular processes involved with chromatin replication, which was supported by a ERC Advanced Grant in 2018. Nuclei containing cells called Eukaryotes contain chromatin, a complex of DNA and proteins, which must also be replicated.

Dekker has uncovered how virus proteins insert errors into the viral RMA, which enable viral mutation that protects them from an evolving environment. She was awarded the Spinoza Prize in 2020 for her molecular-level studies of how chemotherapy kills cancer cells.

== Awards and honours ==
- 2006 Elected to the Young Academy of Europe
- 2007 European Young Investigators Award
- 2013 European Physical Society Emmy Noether Award
- 2013 European Research Council Consolidator Grant
- 2018 NWO TOP grant
- 2018 ERC Advanced Grant
- 2019 Elected to European Molecular Biology Organization
- 2020 NWO Spinoza Prize
- 2023 Physica Prize

== Selected publications ==
- Liu, Z; van Veen, E; Sánchez, H; Solano, B; Palmero Moya, FJ; McCluskey, KA; Ramírez Montero, D; van Laar, T; Dekker, NH (17 April 2024). "A Biophysics Toolbox for Reliable Data Acquisition and Processing in Integrated Force-Confocal Fluorescence Microscopy". ACS Photonics. 11 (4): 1592–1603. doi:10.1021/acsphotonics.3c01739. PMC 11027178. PMID 38645993.
- Sánchez, H; Liu, Z; van Veen, E; van Laar, T; Diffley, JFX; Dekker, NH (23 October 2023). "A chromatinized origin reduces the mobility of ORC and MCM through interactions and spatial constraint". Nature Communications. 14 (1): 6735. doi:10.1038/s41467-023-42524-8. PMC 10593741. PMID 37872142.
- Ramírez Montero, D; Sánchez, H; van Veen, E; van Laar, T; Solano, B; Diffley, JFX; Dekker, NH (14 April 2023). "Nucleotide binding halts diffusion of the eukaryotic replicative helicase during activation". Nature Communications. 14 (1): 2082. doi:10.1038/s41467-023-37093-9. PMC 10104875. PMID 37059705.
- Janissen, R; Woodman, A; Shengjuler, D; Vallet, T; Lee, KM; Kuijpers, L; Moustafa, IM; Fitzgerald, F; Huang, PN; Perkins, AL; Harki, DA; Arnold, JJ; Solano, B; Shih, SR; Vignuzzi, M; Cameron, CE; Dekker, NH (4 November 2021). "Induced intra- and intermolecular template switching as a therapeutic mechanism against RNA viruses". Molecular Cell. 81 (21): 4467–4480.e7. doi:10.1016/j.molcel.2021.10.003. PMC 8628313. PMID 34687604.
- Sánchez, H; McCluskey, K; van Laar, T; van Veen, E; Asscher, FM; Solano, B; Diffley, JFX; Dekker, NH (26 March 2021). "DNA replication origins retain mobile licensing proteins". Nature Communications. 12 (1): 1908. doi:10.1038/s41467-021-22216-x. PMC 7998030. PMID 33772005.
- Kaczmarczyk, A; Meng, H; Ordu, O; Noort, JV; Dekker, NH (8 January 2020). "Chromatin fibers stabilize nucleosomes under torsional stress". Nature Communications. 11 (1): 126. doi:10.1038/s41467-019-13891-y. PMC 6949304. PMID 31913285.
- Janissen, R; Arens, MMA; Vtyurina, NN; Rivai, Z; Sunday, ND; Eslami-Mossallam, B; Gritsenko, AA; Laan, L; de Ridder, D; Artsimovitch, I; Dekker, NH; Abbondanzieri, EA; Meyer, AS (23 August 2018). "Global DNA Compaction in Stationary-Phase Bacteria Does Not Affect Transcription". Cell. 174 (5): 1188–1199.e14. doi:10.1016/j.cell.2018.06.049. PMC 6108918. PMID 30057118.
- Koster, DA; Palle, K; Bot, ES; Bjornsti, MA; Dekker, NH (12 July 2007). "Antitumour drugs impede DNA uncoiling by topoisomerase I.". Nature. 448 (7150): 213–7. doi:10.1038/nature05938. PMID 17589503.
- Koster, DA; Croquette, V; Dekker, C; Shuman, S; Dekker, NH (31 March 2005). "Friction and torque govern the relaxation of DNA supercoils by eukaryotic topoisomerase IB". Nature. 434 (7033): 671–4. doi:10.1038/nature03395. PMID 15800630.
