= Jacques Neefjes =

Dutch biochemist

- Sjaak Neefjes
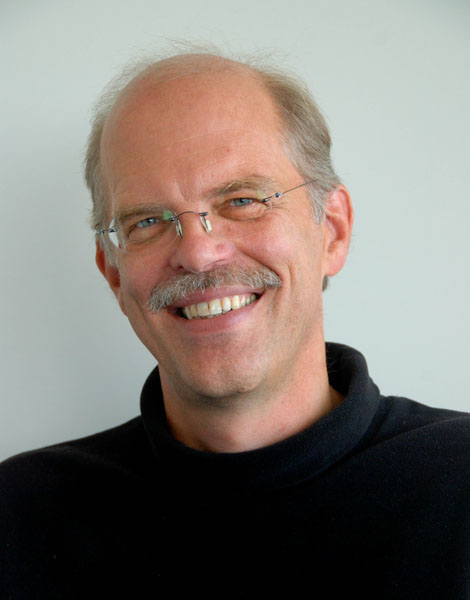
- Born: 8 December 1959 (age 66)
- Education: Vrije Universiteit Amsterdam; Netherlands Cancer Institute
- Scientific career
- Institutions: Leiden University Medical Center

Jacobus Jozef Cornelus Neefjes (born 8 December 1959) is a Dutch scientist who made breakthroughs in several research disciplines such as immunology, cell biology, chemistry, cancer biology, microbiology, and epidemiology. He is a professor at the Leiden University Medical Center. In 2020 he was one of four winners of the Spinoza Prize.

== Biography ==
From 1979 to 1985, Jacques Neefjes studied Chemistry at the Vrije Universiteit Amsterdam. Then, he performed his Ph.D. studies at the Division of Cellular Biochemistry, in the Netherlands Cancer Institute (NKI) under the supervision of Prof. Dr. Ploegh in Amsterdam. During his thesis, he investigated the Cell Biological Aspect of MHC class I and II molecules. He obtained his Ph.D. degree on the 2nd of November 1990 with Cum Laude.

After his Ph.D., Jacques Neefjes did two post-doctoral visits. First, from 1991 to 1992, he visited the laboratory of Drs Benoit and Mathis at the Institut de Chimie Biologique, Strasbourg (France). Then, he obtained a 2-year fellowship from the European Molecular Biology Organization (EMBO) to visit the laboratory of Prof. Dr. Hämmerling at the German Cancer Research Center (DKFZ), in Heidelberg (Germany) from 1992 to 1993. In 1993, Jacques Neefjes became a staff member of the Division of Cellular Biochemistry at the NKI. In 1998, he became head of the division of Tumor Biology. From 1999 to 2016, he occupied the position of "Extraordinary professor" at the Leiden University. He was the Dean of the Graduate School Oncology Amsterdam (OOA) from 2000 to 2003.

Since 2016, he is head of the Cell and Chemical Biology department at the Leiden University Medical Center (the Netherlands).

== Works ==
During his career, Jacques Neefjes has authored more than 280 scientific publications reaching more than 30,000 citations. Neefjes’ discoveries on antigen presentation by the class I and II major histocompatibility complexes (MHC) constitute today's textbook knowledge. Through his exploration of the cell biology of the MHC, Jacques Neefjes became an expert on endocytosis and intracellular transport. In 2017, Neefjes and his team made fundamental discoveries regarding endosome positioning by the endoplasmic reticulum. Neefjes further expanded his work on endosomes to phagosomes and intracellular bacteria. By combining chemistry, cell biology and biochemistry with genetic screens, Neefjes identified inhibitors to disturb bacterial survival strategies, representing one of the first antibiotics acting by targeting the host, rather than the pathogen. In 2015, Neefjes has demonstrated that Salmonella infection promote cancer development. Since 2019, Jacques Neefjes is co-financing the production of a promising cancer drug, Aclarubicin, which disappeared from the European market at the beginning of the 21st century.

== Distinction ==
=== Honours and awards ===
- 1990 Antonie van Leeuwenhoek award
- 1996 Golden Medal of the Royal Dutch Chemical Society (KNCV)
- 2007 Elected as a member of European Molecular Biology Organization (EMBO)
- 2010 Elected as a member at the European Academy of Cancer Sciences
- 2013 Elected as a member of Academia Europaea
- 2013 Recipient and main applicant for the Gravity Program at the Institute for Chemical Immunology ICI
- 2014 Elected as a member of the Norwegian Academy of Science and Letters (Det Norske Videnskaps-Akademi)
- 2015 Elected as a member and Dutch representative in the European Cooperation in Science and Technology Committee
- 2015 Elected as a member of the Royal Netherlands Academy of Arts and Sciences (KNAW)
- 2015 van Loghem Lecture, the annual career award for research in Immunology from the Dutch Immunology Society NVVI
- 2019 Josephine Nefkens Award for cancer research
- 2020 Spinoza Prize

=== Honorary Lectures ===
- 2012 Ruysch lecture AMC, Amsterdam
- 2012 Beatty Lecture, McGill University, Montreal, Canada

== Selected research articles ==
The Biosynthetic Pathway of MHC Class II but Not Class I Molecules Intersects the Endocytic Route.
Neefjes JJ, Stollorx V, Peters PJ, Geuze HJ, and Ploegh HL.
Cell. 1990. 61:171-183.

The major substrates for TAP in vivo are derived from newly synthesized proteins.
Reits EA, Vos JC, Grommé M, and Neefjes JJ.
Nature. 2000. 404:774–778.

Intracellular bacterial growth is controlled by a kinase network around PKB/AKT1.
Kuijl C, Savage ND, Marsman M, Tuin AW, Janssen L, Egan DA, Ketema M, Van Den Nieuwendijk R, Van Den Eeden SJ, Geluk A, Poot A, Van Der Marel G, Beijersbergen RL, Overkleeft H, Ottenhoff TH, and Neefjes JJ.
Nature. 2007. 450:725–730

An ER-Associated Pathway Defines Endosomal Architecture for Controlled Cargo Transport.
Jongsma ML, Berlin I, Wijdeven RH, Janssen L, Janssen GM, Garstka MA, Janssen H, Mensink M, van Veelen PA, Spaapen RM, and Neefjes JJ.
Cell. 2016. 166:152-166
