= Alexander Tielens =

Dutch astronomer (born 1953)

- Born: 1953 (age 72–73)
- Awards: Spinoza Prize (2012)
- Scientific career
- Fields: Astronomy; Astrophysics; Astrochemistry
- Workplaces: NASA Ames Research Center; University of California, Berkeley; University of Groningen; Leiden University; University of Maryland, College Park

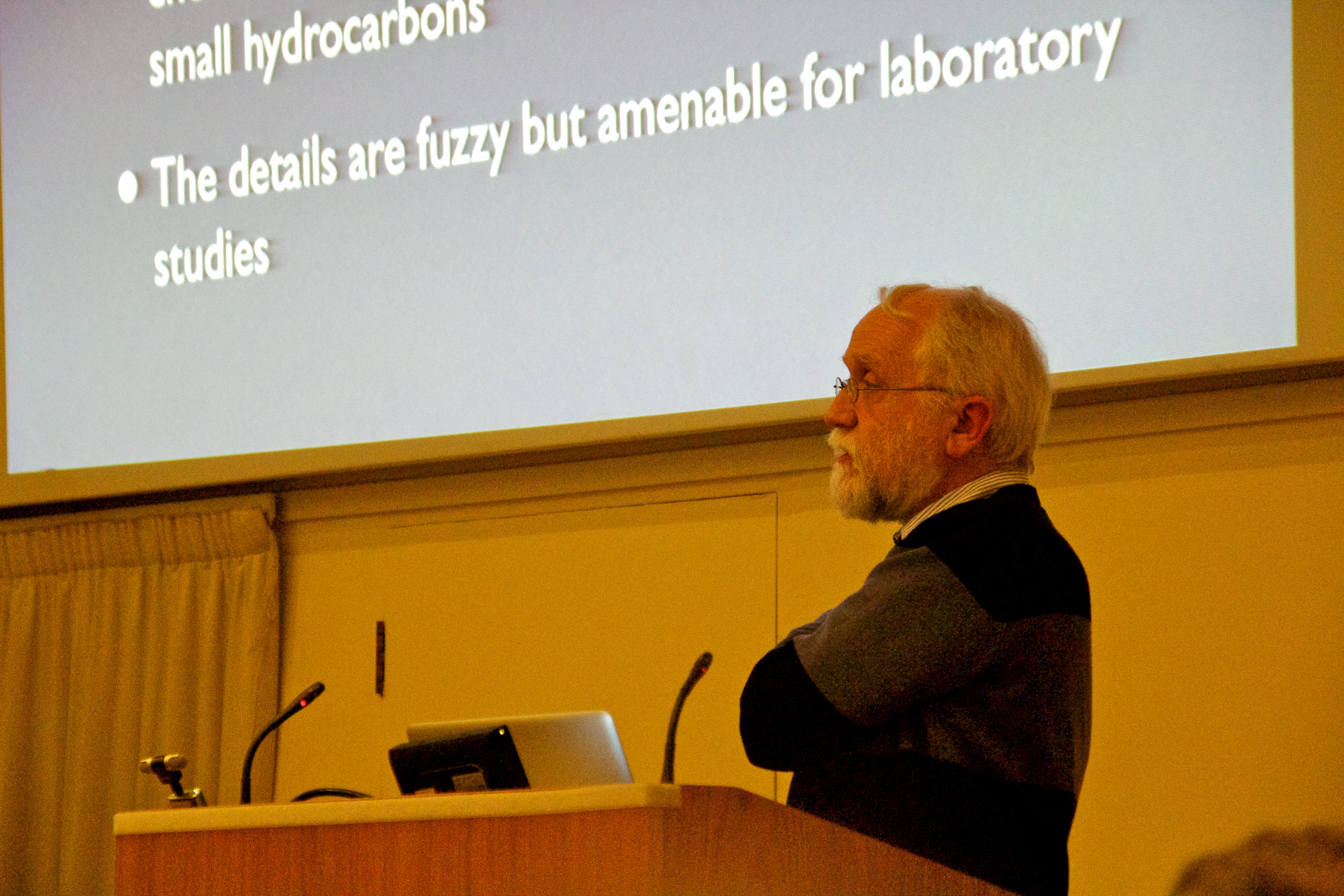
Alexander Tielens presenting at the Royal Astronomical Society in 2012.

Alexander Godfried Gerardus Maria (Xander) Tielens (born 1953) is a Dutch astronomer. He is Adjunct Professor at the University of Maryland, College Park and Emeritus Professor at Leiden Observatory, Leiden University, in the Netherlands. He previously worked at NASA Ames Research Center, California and the University of California, Berkeley, and was previously a professor at the University of Groningen. In 2012, Tielens received the highest distinction in Dutch science, the Spinoza Prize, and he was the most cited astronomer in the Netherlands.

== Biography ==
Tielens has contributed significantly to several fields of astronomy, including interstellar physics and astrochemistry. He is mostly known for his work on large aromatic molecules (PAHs) in space and on photodissociation regions. He is also the author of a reference textbook on the interstellar medium.

Tielens is the project scientist of the HIFI instrument on board of the Herschel Space Observatory. He used to be the NASA Project Scientist of the Stratospheric Observatory for Infrared Astronomy.

Since 2012 Tielens has been a member of the Royal Netherlands Academy of Arts and Sciences.
