= Mike Jetten =

Dutch professor of Microbiology

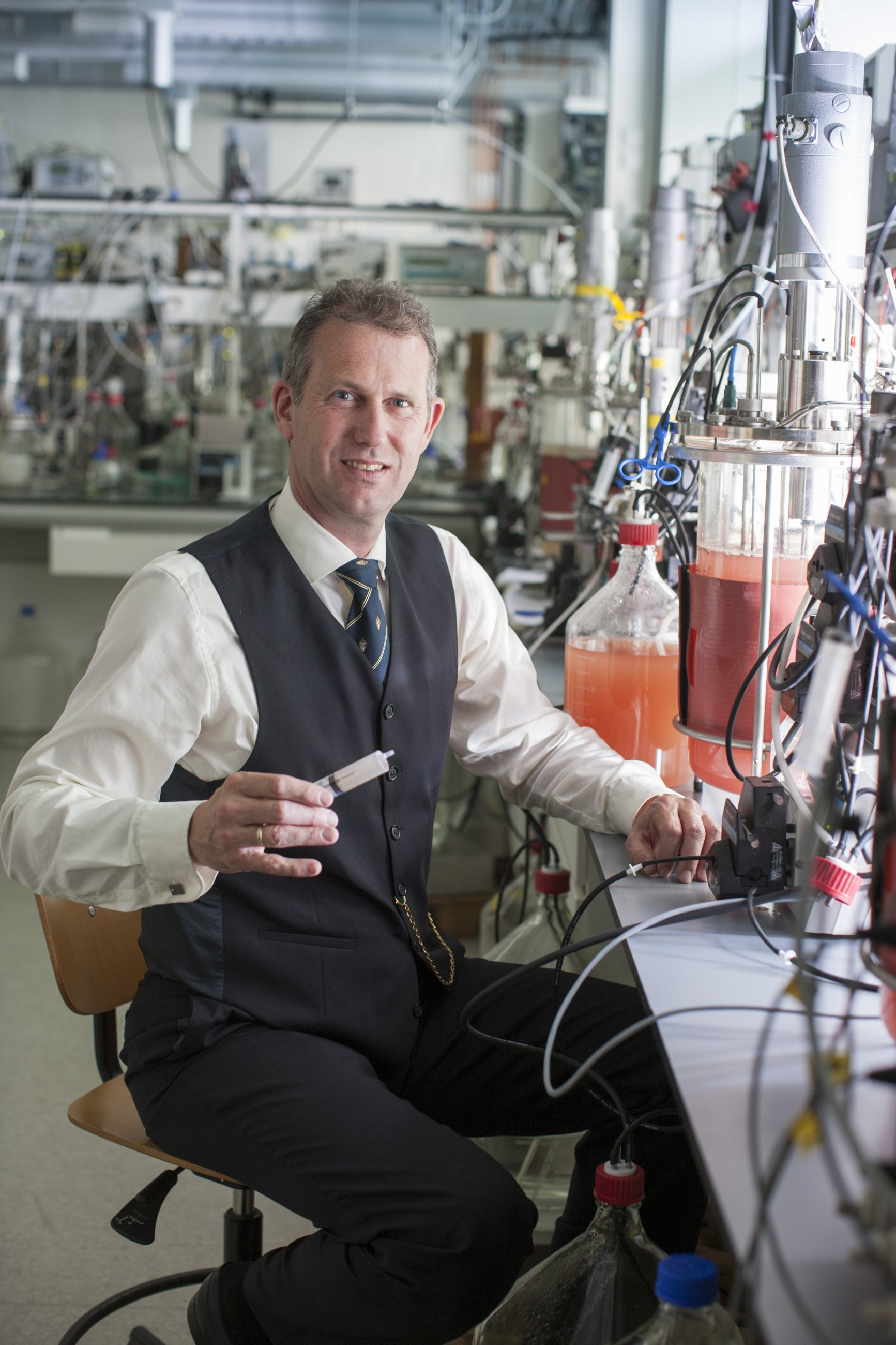
Mike Jetten (2012)

Mike Jetten (born 1962) is a Dutch professor of Microbiology at the Radboud University Nijmegen. He was a winner of the 2012 Spinoza Prize.

Jetten received two European Research Council Advanced grants. The first grant was awarded to him in 2008 for his research on Anammox bacteria. He received his second grant in 2013.

Since 2010 Jetten has been a member of the Royal Netherlands Academy of Arts and Sciences.

In 2012 he was one of four winners of the Dutch Spinoza Prize and received a 2.5 million euro grant. The awarding organisation, the Netherlands Organisation for Scientific Research praised Jetten for providing new insights. Jetten has proven that several reactions that were considered impossible are used by bacteria to obtain energy, which plays an important role in the global cycles of nitrogen, methane and sulphur.
