= Leiden Institute for Brain and Cognition =

Dutch research institute

LIBC logo

The Leiden Institute for Brain and Cognition or LIBC is an interfaculty network for interdisciplinary research on brain and cognition in the Netherlands. The Leiden University Medical Center and the Faculties of Humanities, Science and Social Behavioural Sciences of Leiden University participate in the LIBC. The LIBC research programs are presented in laboratories.

There are different laboratories for each stage of the human life span.

The LIBC focuses on four hotspots:

- LIBC Junior
- LIBC Pharma
- LIBC Stress
- LIBC Language

== Mission ==
This center has different research and educational missions related to coordinate and develop programs carried out by researchers and professionals of different scientific areas.

Research Mission:

- To initiate and coordinate high-quality, multidisciplinary research on brain and cognition, carried out by researchers working in the participating faculties.
- To take care of the set-up and management of an excellent research infrastructure.
- To develop proposals for joint research programmes between the various participating faculties

Education Mission:

- To take care of the set-up and management of an excellent research infrastructure.
- To develop proposals for joint research programmes between the various participating faculties.
- To contribute to the training and supervision of PhD students in the area of brain and cognition.
- To develop and offer interdisciplinary, inter-faculty courses and course programmes in the area of brain and cognition.

Science Communication Mission:

- To provide engaging public events and other science communication about the LIBC research.

== Research Areas ==
- Babylab: In this laboratory researchers try to find out how babies come to understand the world around them. How do babies acquire language and how do they come to understand the relation between some action and the result of that action
- Brain & Development: The lab explores the relations between brain development and cognitive development. A special focus of the lab is to investigate how brain development, including changes in function and connectivity, relates to typical and atypical development of control, decision making and self-control.
- Brain & Language: This laboratory researches in how language is represented in the brain. Through the use of electroencephalography (EEG) the brain activity during different language tasks is investigated.
- Brain and Education Lab: The laboratory explores the development of complex cognitive processes involved in skills such as learning, reading and math are investigated from a developmental Cognitive Neuroscience approach.
- Child and Adolescent Psychiatry: The Curium-LUMC Child and Adolescent Psychiatry research program aims at connecting research and clinical practice. For instance, it deals with screening methods for child psychiatric problems for family and general practitioners, the effectiveness of treatments (effects in daily practice, in heterogeneous groups), and underlying brain mechanisms that are associated with specific child and adolescent psychiatric disorders
- Cognitive Ergonomics and Enhancement: the research aims at optimizing industrial performance by minimizing risks and task demands; the ergonomics approach, and maximizing human capacity.
- Cognitive neuroscience lab: In this lab, the main focus of study are the cognitive processes and neural mechanisms underlying mental functions such as perception, attention, memory, decision making and action control.
- Family Relationships: In the Laboratory of Family Relationships, researchers examine the family as a primary socialization context.
- Neurocognitive disorders and psychopathology: the laboratory explores atypical and typical psychological disorders using various different measures.
- Psychiatric Neuroimaging: In the Psychiatric Neuroimaging Lab, neuroimaging is used to examine structure and functioning of brain areas and circuits in children, adults and elderly with psychopathology disorders.

== See also ==
- University of Leiden
- Leiden University Medical Center
