= Nij Beets =

- Village
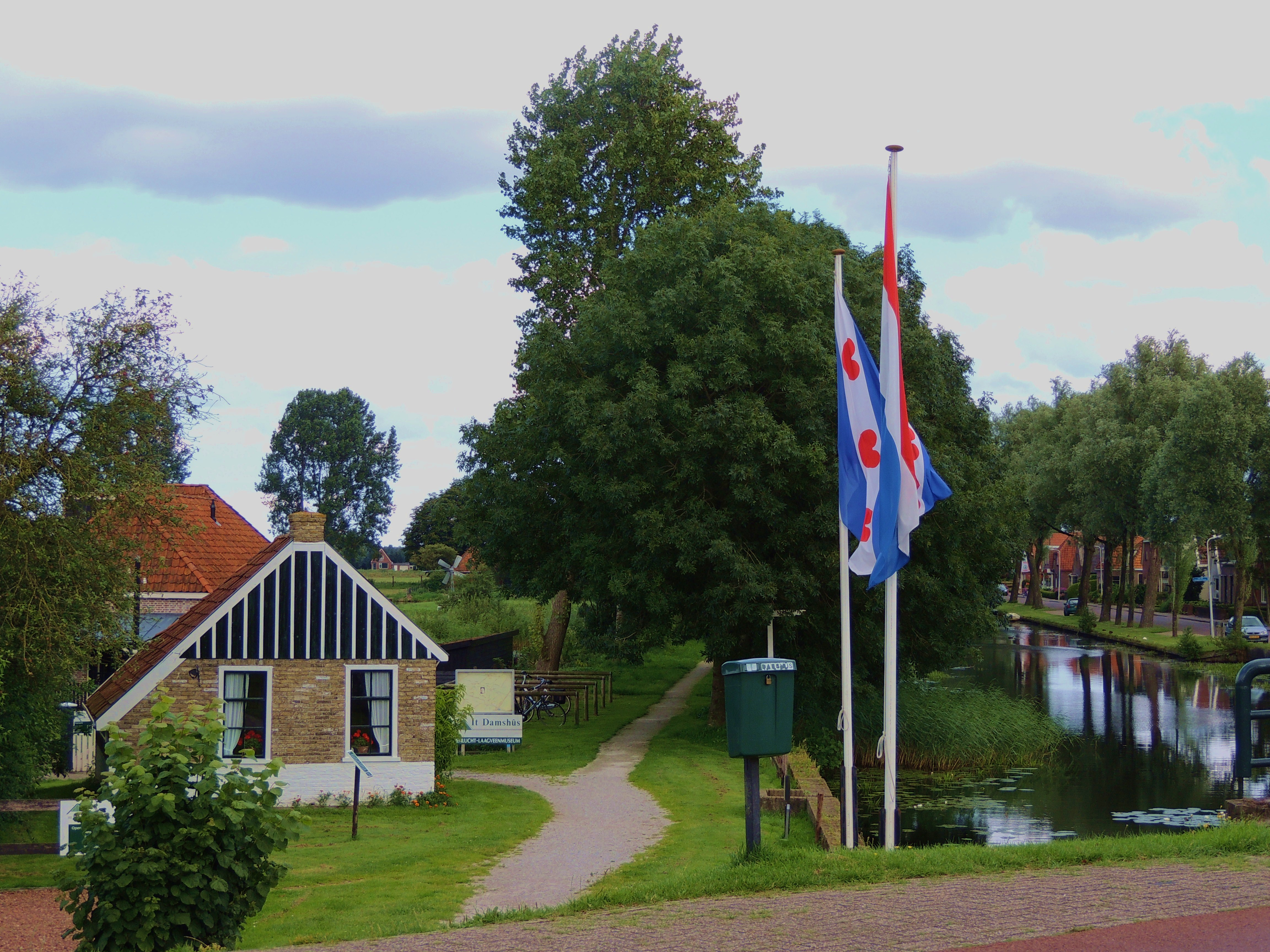

- Flag Coat of arms

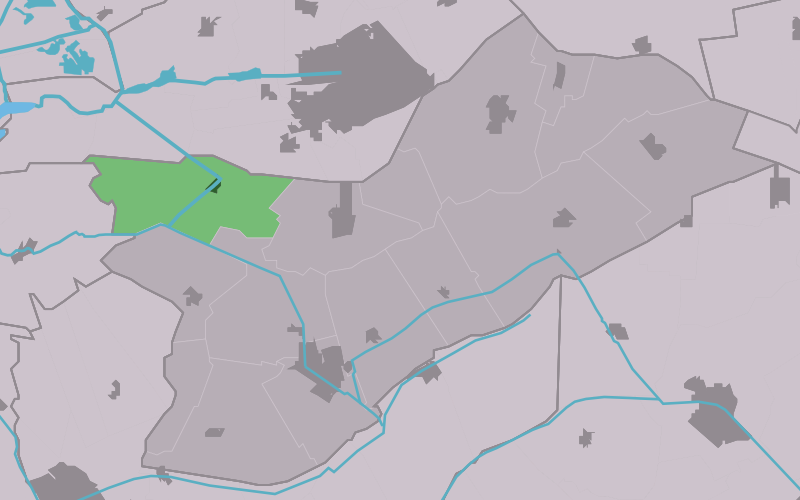
- Location in Opsterland municipality

- Location in the Netherlands Nij Beets (Netherlands)
- Country: Netherlands
- Province: Friesland
- Municipality: Opsterland

Area
  - Total: 19.11 km^{2} (7.38 sq mi)
- Elevation: −1.1 m (−3.6 ft)

Population (2021)
  - Total: 1,670
  - Density: 87.4/km^{2} (226/sq mi)
- Time zone: UTC+1 (CET)
  - Summer (DST): UTC+2 (CEST)
- Postal code: 9245
- Dialing code: 0512

Nij Beets (Dutch: Nieuw Beets) is a village in the municipality of Opsterland in the east of Friesland in the Netherlands. It had a population of around 1,705 in January 2017.

== History ==
Nij Beets was founded in 1863 by peat workers. The peat workers came to Nij Beets around 1860 to excavate and make peat of the turf. The settlement was near to the old village Beets. The area was a major transit route to the former municipality Utingeradiel, de Zeveinsweg; north lay Ga Weg—now Prikkewei.

In 1831 a new road, the Nije Leppedyk—later the Domela Nieuwenhuiswei—between Zeveinsweg and Gean Wei was constructed. The fields ranged from 1863 to kick off. Twenty years later the landscape appeared as alternating strips of wasteland, hayfields and peat bog. It was mainly the de Prikkewei constructed, on the east side of the Skipsleat and north of the Nij Beetsterfeart. In the late 19th century the extraction of peat slowly continued.

=== Settlement ===
In 1891 a wooden church was built. In 1908 a Dutch Reformed Church of stone was built near the Skipsleat. In 1917 a Reformed church on the Prikkewei followed.

Twenty homes were built in 1921 on the Swynswei (the former Zeveinswei) and twelve more were built in 1938 and 1940 on a side path of the Domela Nieuwenhuiswei.

The history of the area and the particular turf industries are currently visible in a small open-air museum with relocated original structures and several reconstructions. The museum is called 'It Damshûs'

== Geography ==
Nij Beets was situated in a polder landscape. The Polderhoofdcanal runs through Nij Beets. As of 2011 it was made navigable. It runs from De Veenhoop off by Nij Beets to the Nije feart by De Uilesprong. The nature area de Kraanlannen is by de Feanhoop. Here are the remnants of the petgatten from the peat time. South of Nij Beets runs the "Boarn". This is a river previously released in the Middelzee. South of the river is natural area De Deelen, that was also a peat source.

Nij Beets is centrally located in the area which borders the forest of Beetsterzwaag and the Frisian Lakes area.

== Community ==
Population
| 1954 | 1801 |
| 1959 | 1628 |
| 1964 | 1586 |
| 1969 | 1529 |
| 1973 | 1428 |
| 2005 | 1691 |

== Gallery ==
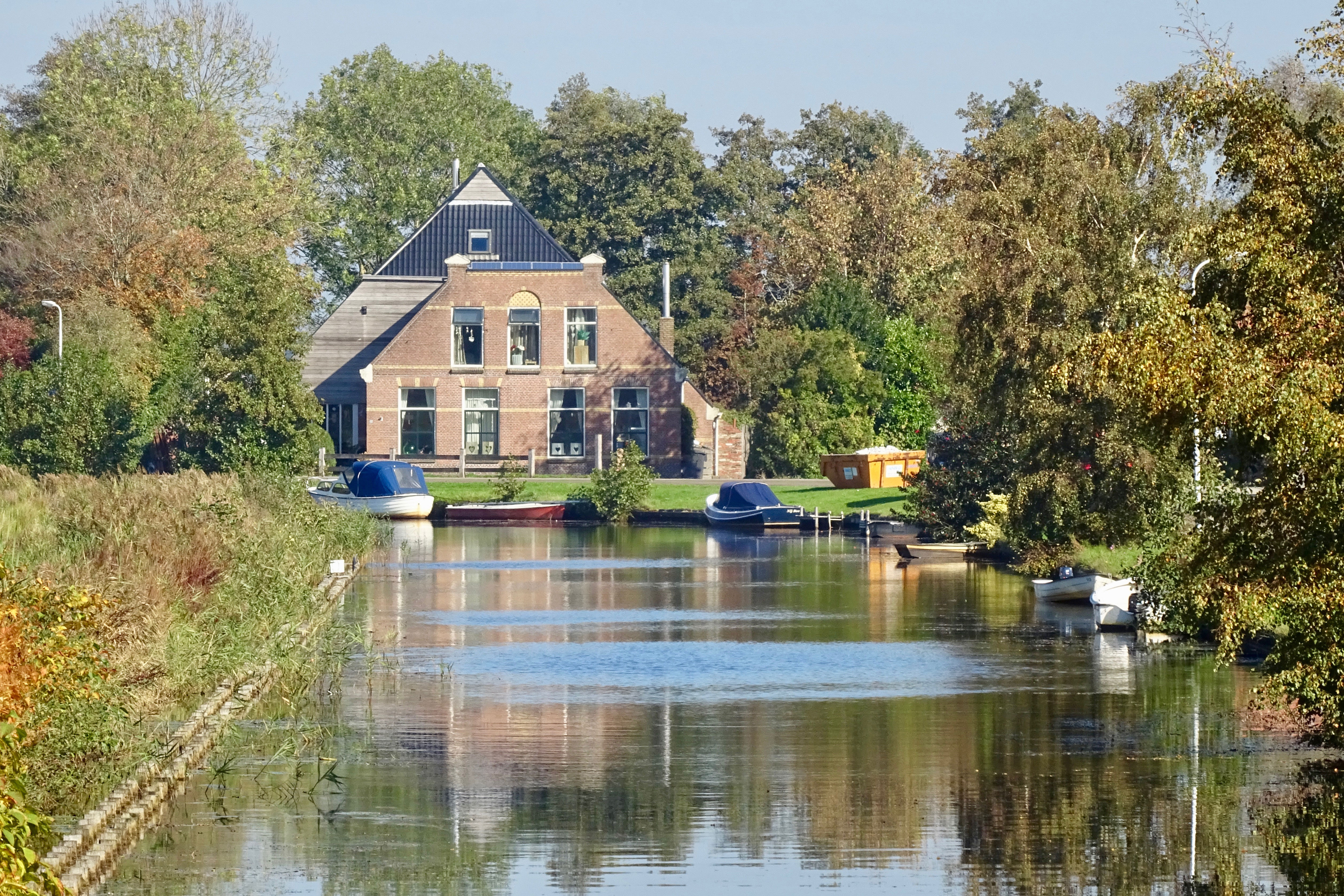
Farm on the canal

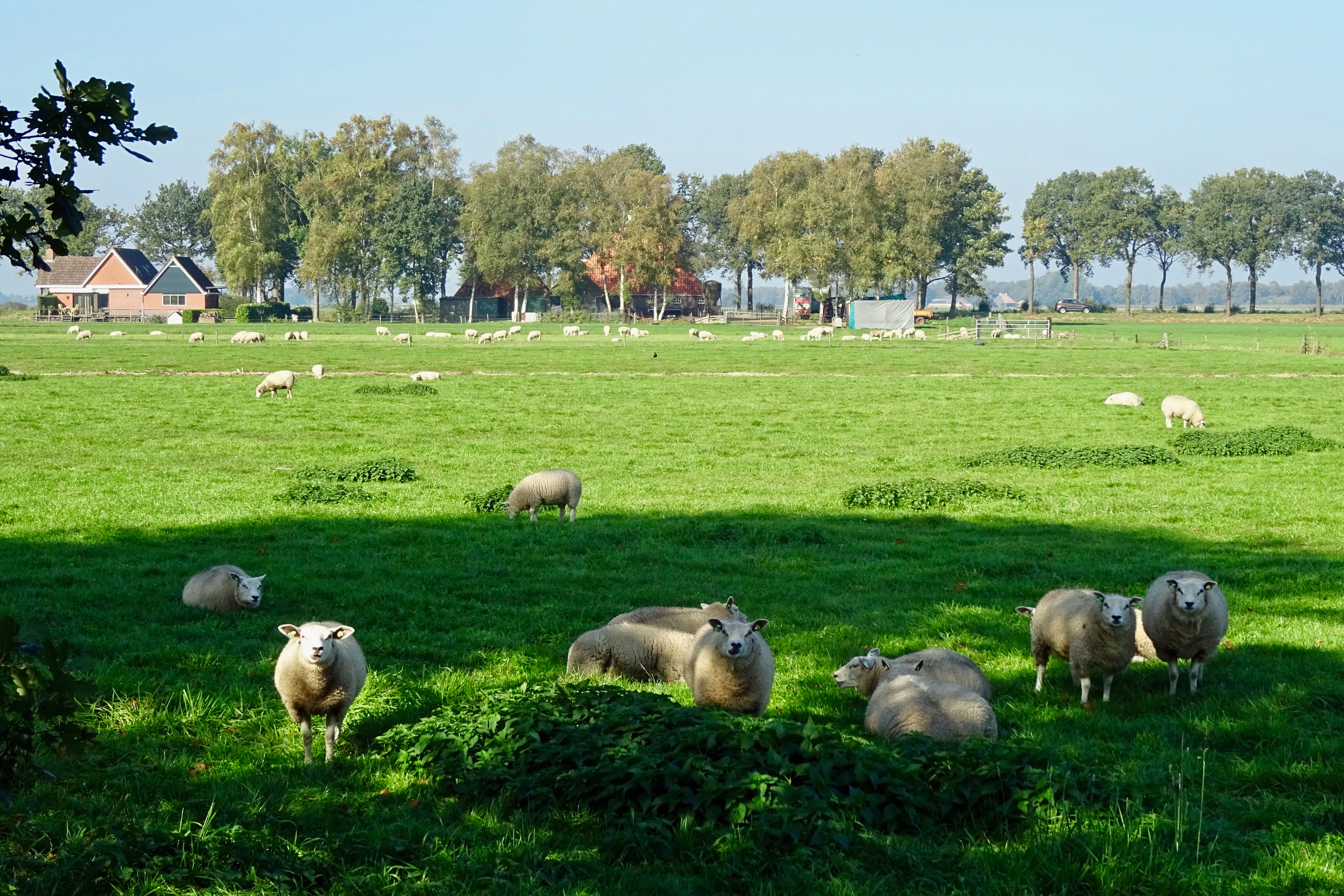
Sheep near Nij Beets

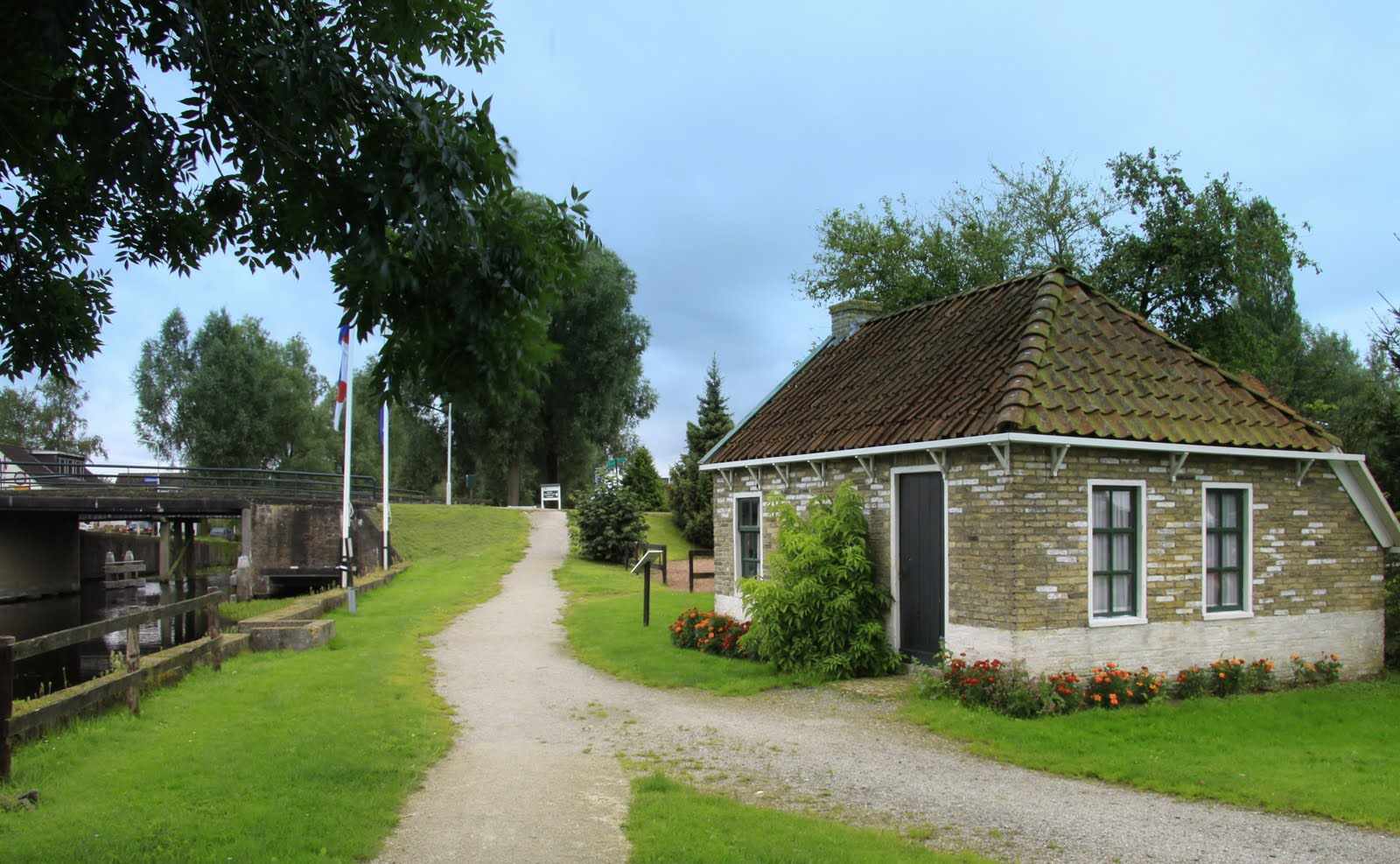
Museum of Nij Beets

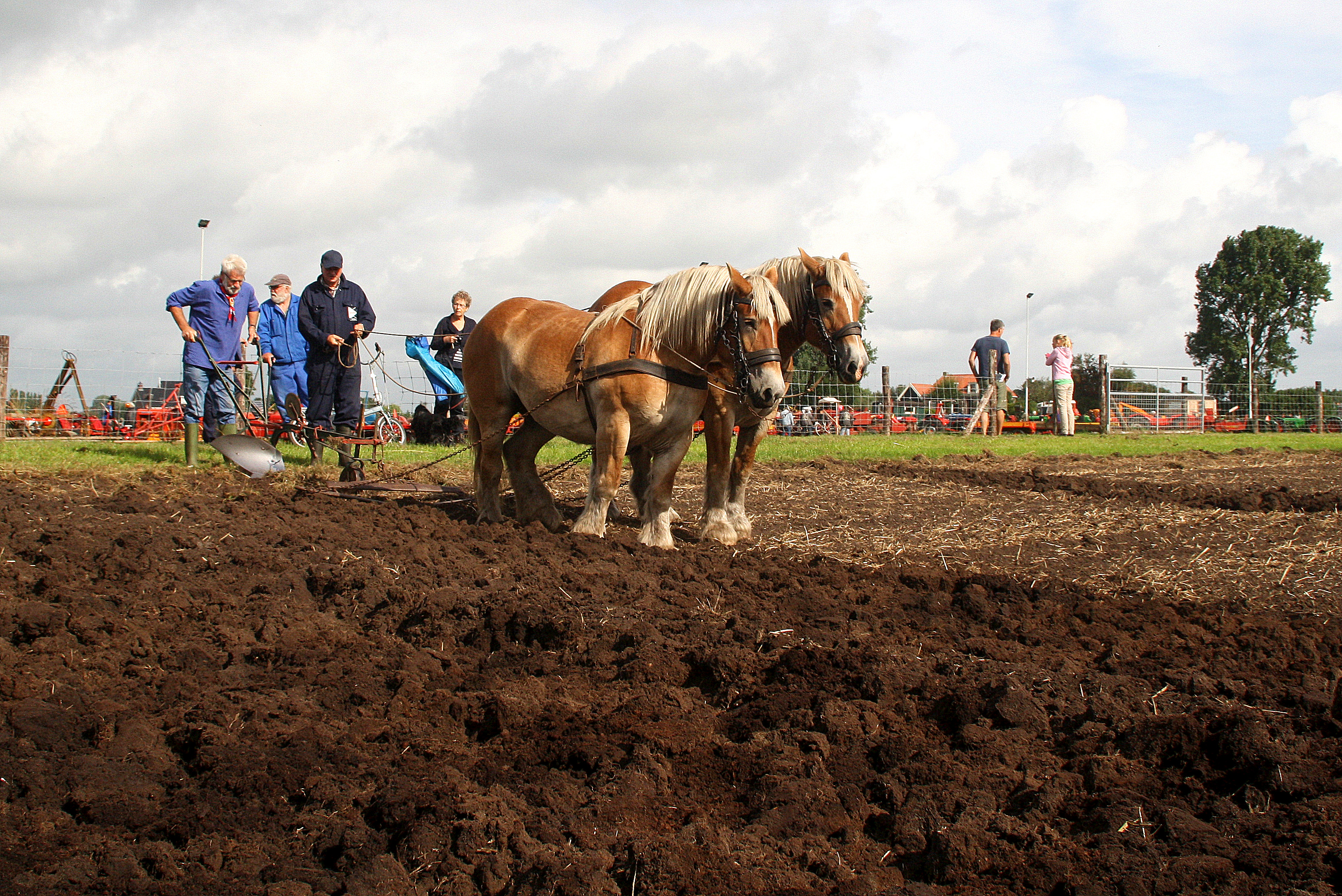
Plowing with horses
