= Maria Yazdanbakhsh =

Dutch immunologist

- Born: 1959 (age 66–67); Goslar
- Education: London School of Hygiene and Tropical Medicine; University of Amsterdam; King's College London
- Scientific career
- Workplaces: University of Leiden; Imperial College London
- Thesis: Immunobiology of eosinophils (1987)

Yazdanbakhsh discovered that parasitic infections downregulate the inflammatory immune responses. She is a pioneer in multidisciplinary research, combining fundamental research, demographic studies and clinical trials.

Maria Yazdanbakhsh (born 1959) is a Dutch immunologist who is Professor of Cellular Immunology of Parasitic Infections and Head of the Department of Parasitology at the Leiden University Medical Center. She was elected Fellow of the European Molecular Biology Organization in 2023.

== Early life and education ==
Yazdanbakhsh was born in Goslar. She completed her undergraduate studies at King's College London with a master's in medical parasitology at the London School of Hygiene and Tropical Medicine. She moved to the University of Amsterdam for her doctoral research, where she studied the immunobiology of eosinophilia. She was postdoctoral researcher at Imperial College London.

== Research and career ==
Yazdanbakhsh launched her independent scientific career at Leiden in 1989. Having focused on the cellular immunology of worm infections, her research considers the interaction of the human immune system with parasites. In 1997, she expanded her research from parasites to include the resulting changes in immune responses and the development of allergic diseases. She focuses on studying how parasites manipulate the immune system, downregulating it to avoid detection by the host. Yazdanbakhsh found that this has implications for the efficacy of vaccines, as a malaria vaccine has an efficacy of 100% in Europe but only 30% in Africa. She studies this effect by combining population studies with field research in Africa and Indonesia and in depth immmunological analysis at Leiden University. As scientific coordinator of Leiden Controlled Human Infection Centre (L-CHIC), she conducts comparative research to study the immune response to infections accurately and quickly in a controlled environment, and eventually rapidly test promising vaccines and medicines.

Yazdanbalhsh showed that, alongside detrimental effects, parasitic infections modify the immune system to prevent inflammatory disease. Her work challenged the immunological origins of the hygiene hypothesis, showing instead that regulatory immune responses (not Th1- and Th2-helper cell balance) is responsible for changing disease profiles. In her studies of low and middle income countries she has shown that exposure to parasites and microorganisms overrides genetic factors.

She works between her research laboratory in the Leiden University Medical Center and clinical trials across Africa and Asia. She has primarily focussed on vaccines to prevent inflammatory diseases and parasitic infection. She was appointed professor at the Leiden University Medical Center in 2005.

== Awards and honours ==
- 2020 Member of the Royal Netherlands Academy of Arts and Sciences (KNAW)
- 2020 Elected to the Academia Europaea
- 2020 Delphine Parrott Lecture of Glasgow University
- 2021 Spinoza Prize
- 2022 ERC Advanced Grant
- 2023 Elected Fellow of European Molecular Biology Organization

== Selected publications ==
- Maria Yazdanbakhsh; Peter G Kremsner; Ronald van Ree (1 April 2002). "Allergy, parasites, and the hygiene hypothesis". Science. 296 (5567): 490–494. Bibcode:2002Sci...296..490Y. doi:10.1126/science.296.5567.490. ISSN 0036-8075. PMID 11964470. Wikidata Q34124658.
- Andrea Cossarizza; Hyun-Dong Chang; Andreas Radbruch; et al. (1 October 2017). "Guidelines for the use of flow cytometry and cell sorting in immunological studies". European Journal of Immunology. 47 (10) (1st ed.): 1584–1797. doi:10.1002/eji.201646632. ISSN 0014-2980. PMID 29023707. Wikidata Q41918189.
- Rick M Maizels; Maria Yazdanbakhsh (September 2003). "Immune regulation by helminth parasites: cellular and molecular mechanisms". Nature Reviews Immunology. 3 (9): 733–44. doi:10.1038/nri1183. ISSN 1474-1733. PMID 12949497. Wikidata Q28204460.
