= Bioorganic chemistry =

Scientific discipline

Bioorganic chemistry is a scientific discipline that combines organic chemistry and biochemistry. It is the branch of life science that deals with the study of biological processes using chemical methods. Protein and enzyme function are examples of these processes.

Sometimes biochemistry is used interchangeably for bioorganic chemistry; the distinction being that bioorganic chemistry is organic chemistry that is focused on the biological aspects. While biochemistry aims at understanding biological processes using chemistry, bioorganic chemistry attempts to expand organic-chemical researches (that is, structures, synthesis, and kinetics) toward biology. When investigating metalloenzymes and cofactors, bioorganic chemistry overlaps bioinorganic chemistry.

== Sub disciplines ==
Biophysical organic chemistry is a term used when attempting to describe intimate details of molecular recognition by bioorganic chemistry.

Natural product chemistry is the process of Identifying compounds found in nature to determine their properties. Compound discoveries have and often lead to medicinal uses, development of herbicides and insecticides.
