= Spinoza Prize =

Dutch scientific award

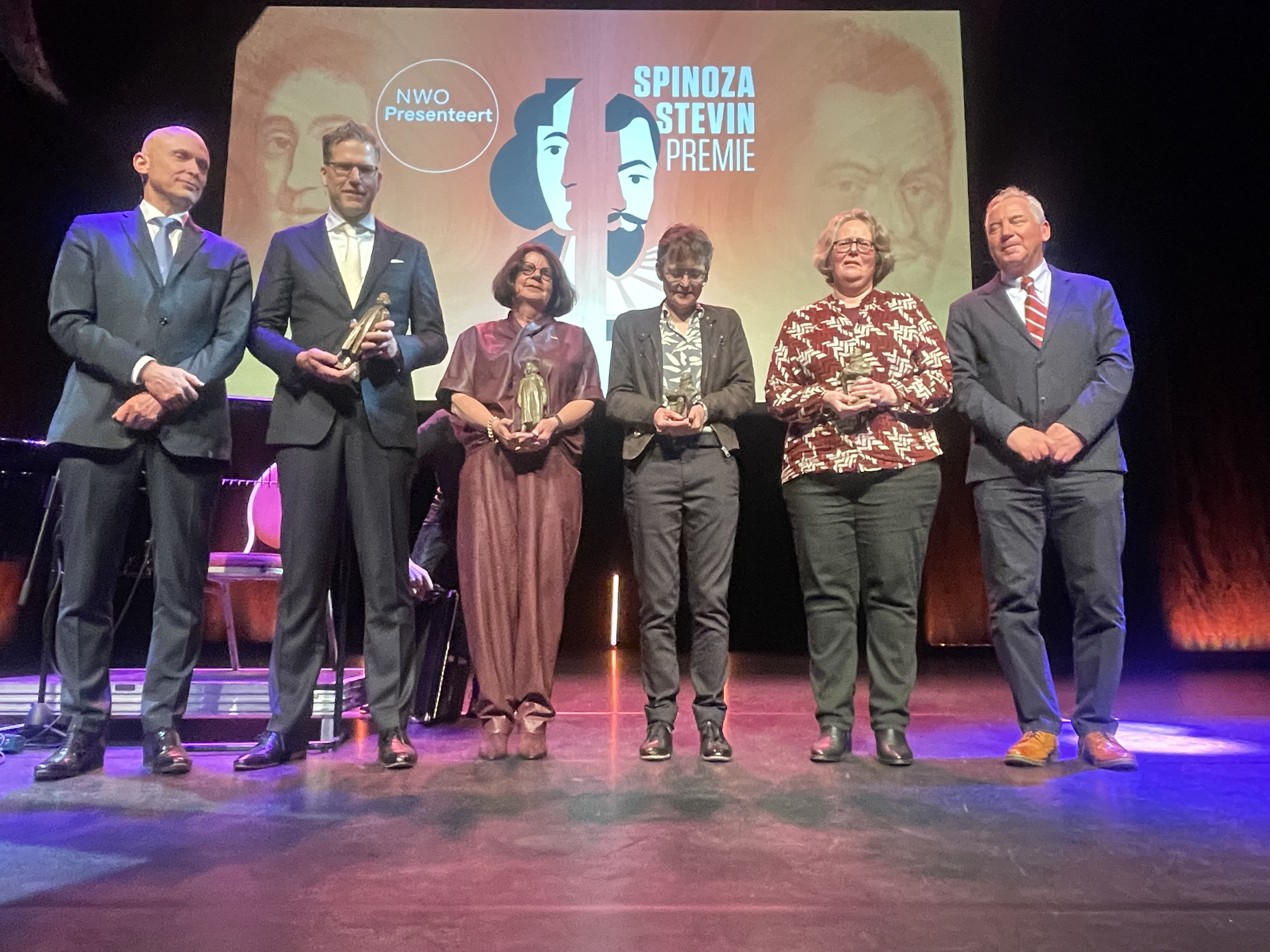
Spinoza and Stevin Prize ceremony 2025, from left to right Judith Pollmann, Thijn Brummelkamp, Ingrid Robeyns and Ilse Aben

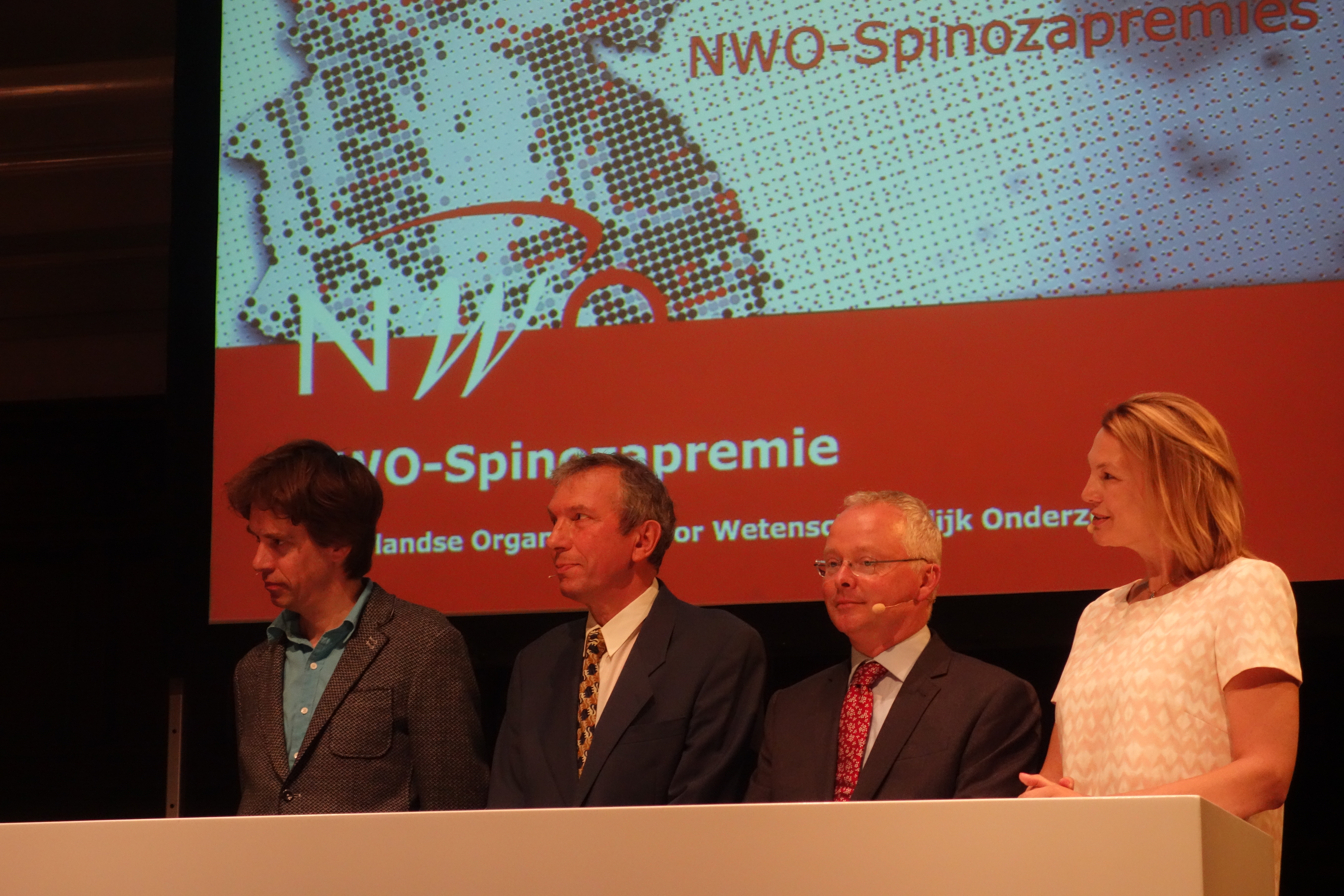
2017 Prize Ceremony

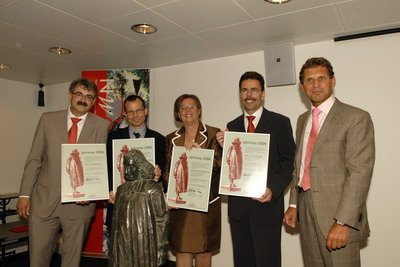
Spinoza Prize winners 2006: Jan Zaanen, Ben Scheres, Jozien Bensing and Carl Figdor. On the far right is NWO director Peter Nijkamp.

The Spinoza Prize (Dutch: Spinozapremie) is an annual award of 1.5 million euro prize money, to be spent on new research given by the Dutch Research Council (NWO). The award is the highest scientific award in the Netherlands. It is named after the philosopher Baruch de Spinoza.

The prize is awarded to researchers in the Netherlands who belong to the best in their field. Academics can nominate each other and an international commission evaluates the submissions. It is sometimes referred to as the Dutch Nobel Prize.

== List of winners ==
The following persons have received the Spinoza Prize:

- 1995 – Frank Grosveld, Ed van den Heuvel, Gerard 't Hooft, Frits van Oostrom
- 1996 – Johan van Benthem, Peter Nijkamp, George Sawatzky
- 1997 – Frits Kortlandt, Bob Pinedo, Rutger van Santen
- 1998 – Jan Hoeijmakers, Hendrik Lenstra, Pieter Muysken
- 1999 – Carlo Beenakker, René de Borst, Anne Cutler, Ronald Plasterk
- 2000 – Ewine van Dishoeck, Daan Frenkel, Dirkje Postma
- 2001 – Dorret Boomsma, Hans Clevers, Bert Meijer, Hans Oerlemans
- 2002 – Henk Barendregt, Els Goulmy, Ad Lagendijk, Frits Rosendaal
- 2003 – Lans Bovenberg, Cees Dekker, Robbert Dijkgraaf, Jan Luiten van Zanden
- 2004 – Jaap Sinninghe Damsté, Ben Feringa, Marinus van IJzendoorn, Michiel van der Klis
- 2005 – René Bernards, Peter Hagoort, Detlef Lohse, Lex Schrijver
- 2006 – Jozien Bensing, Carl Figdor, Ben Scheres, Jan Zaanen
- 2007 – Deirdre Curtin, Marcel Dicke, Leo Kouwenhoven, Wil Roebroeks
- 2008 – Marjo van der Knaap, Joep Leerssen, Theo Rasing, Willem de Vos
- 2009 – Albert van den Berg, Michel Ferrari, Marten Scheffer
- 2010 – Naomi Ellemers, Marijn Franx, Piet Gros, Ineke Sluiter
- 2011 – Heino Falcke, Patti Valkenburg, Erik Verlinde
- 2012 – Mike Jetten, Ieke Moerdijk, Annemarie Mol, Alexander Tielens
- 2013 – Mikhail Katsnelson, Piek Vossen, Bert Weckhuysen
- 2014 – Dirk Bouwmeester, Corinne Hofman, Mark van Loosdrecht, Theunis Piersma
- 2015 – René Janssen, Birgit Meyer, Aad van der Vaart, Cisca Wijmenga
- 2016 – Wilhelm Huck, Lodi Nauta, Mihai Netea, Bart van Wees
- 2017 – Eveline Crone, Albert Heck, Michel Orrit, Alexander van Oudenaarden
- 2018 – Anna Akhmanova, Carsten de Dreu, Marileen Dogterom, John van der Oost
- 2019 – Bas van Bavel, Ronald Hanson, Amina Helmi, Yvette van Kooyk
- 2020 – Nynke Dekker, Jan van Hest, Pauline Kleingeld, Sjaak Neefjes
- 2021 – José van Dijck, Marc Koper, Lieven Vandersypen and Maria Yazdanbakhsh
- 2022 – Thea Hilhorst, Klaas Landsman, Corné Pieterse, Ignas Snellen
- 2023 – Joyeeta Gupta, Toby Kiers
- 2024 – Bernet Elzinga, Detlef van Vuuren
- 2025 – Thijn Brummelkamp, Judith Pollmann
- 2026 – Hermen Overkleeft, Karin Roelofs
