= Radboud University Nijmegen =

Public research university in Nijmegen, Netherlands

Radboud University
- Radboud Universiteit
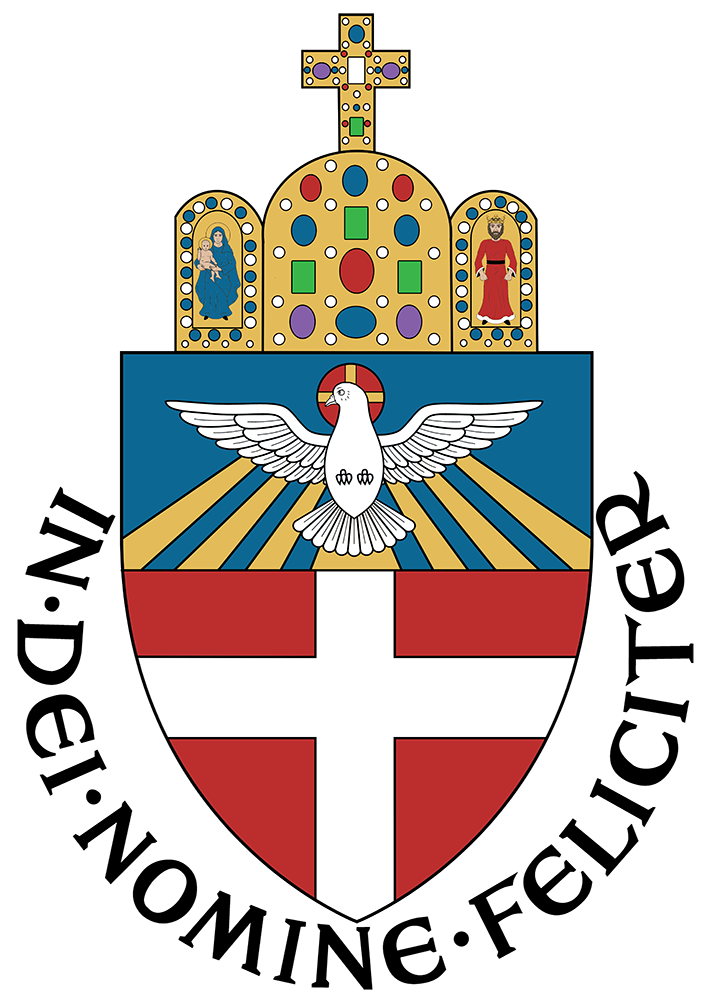
- Former name: Catholic University of Nijmegen (1923-2004)
- Motto: In Dei Nomine Feliciter (Latin)
- Motto in English: Happily in God's name
- Type: Public research university
- Established: 17 October 1923; 103 years ago
- Affiliations: EUA; IFCU; Guild of European Research-Intensive Universities; VSNU
- President: Alexandra van Huffelen
- Rector: José Sanders
- Academic staff: 3,467 (2023)
- Administrative staff: 2,735 (2021)
- Students: 24,104 (October 2024)
- Location: Nijmegen, Gelderland, Netherlands
- Campus: Urban
- Colors: Red Impact
- Website: www.ru.nl/en
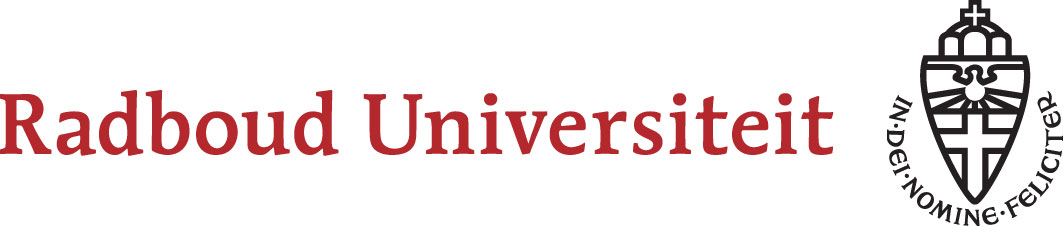

Radboud University (abbreviated as RU; Dutch: Radboud Universiteit, formerly Katholieke Universiteit Nijmegen) is a public research university located in Nijmegen, Netherlands. RU has seven faculties and more than 24,000 students.

The university was established in 1923. In 2020, 391 PhD degrees were awarded, and 8,396 scientific articles were published. To bolster the international exchange of academic knowledge, Radboud University joined the Guild of European Research-Intensive Universities in 2016.

Among its alumni Radboud University counts 14 Spinoza Prize laureates, 2 Stevin Prize laureates, 1 Nobel Prize laureate, Sir Konstantin Novoselov, and 6 prime ministers of the Netherlands, including the current prime minister Rob Jetten. Other notable alumni include former chairman of Unilever Marijn Emmanuel Dekkers, influential priest and theologian Henri Nouwen, biologist Frans de Waal and First Vice-President of the European Commission Frans Timmermans. Former students have also won 3 Olympic medals since 2000, all in rowing.

== Coat of arms ==
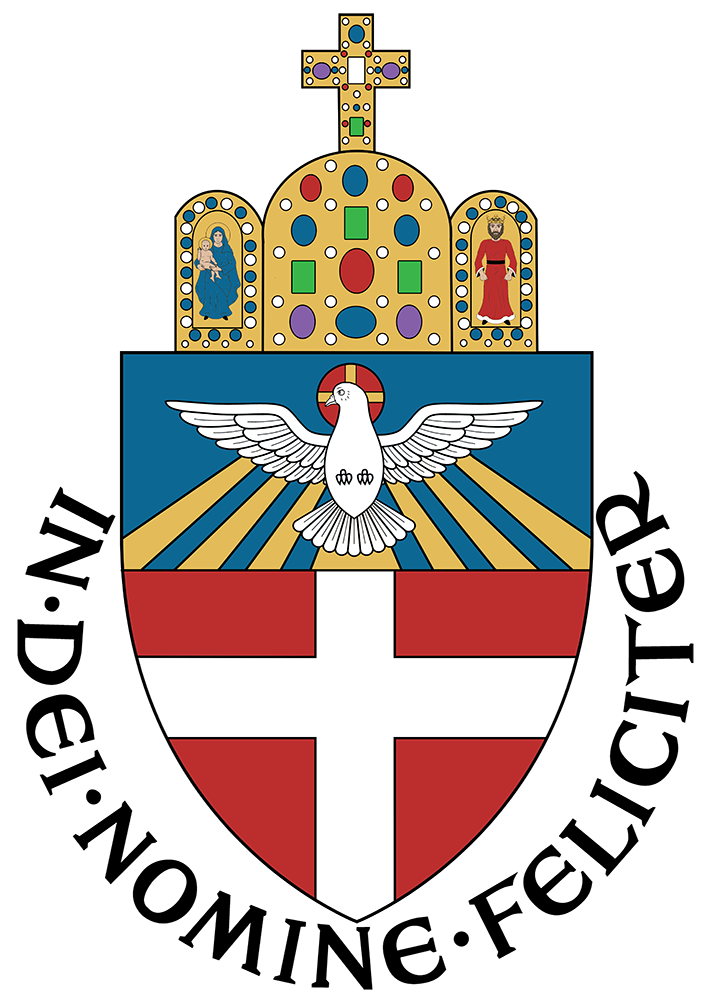
Coat of arms

Radboud University's coat of arms was designed at the time of the founding of the university by the goldsmith workshop of the Brom family in Utrecht. The lower part represents the coat of arms of the Catholic Church in the Netherlands. The dove in the upper part of the coat of arms is the symbol of the Holy Spirit. The entire shield is surmounted by the Imperial Crown of the Holy Roman Empire because Nijmegen was once home to Frankish King Charlemagne. Underneath the coat of arms one finds the university's motto "In Dei Nomine Feliciter", meaning "happily in the name of God". The coat of arms is used on most of the university's official documents, including the university's bachelor, master and PhD certificates. For 2023 a special version of the coat of arms was designed to celebrate Radboud University's 100-year anniversary.

== History ==
The establishment of a university in the city of Nijmegen goes far back. The first University of Nijmegen was founded in 1655 as the Kwartierlijke Academie van Nijmegen. Students developed their skills in the traditional fields of theology, medicine and law. Although the university had its successes, the Kwartierlijke Academie terminated around 1680. The university was unable to recover from successive outbreaks of the plague and the French invasion of the Netherlands in 1672.

After several attempts to establish a new university in Nijmegen, the current Radboud University Nijmegen was established in 1923 under the name Katholieke Universiteit Nijmegen (Catholic University of Nijmegen). It was founded by the Saint Radboud Foundation, a network of bishops that wished to emancipate Catholic intellectuals in the Netherlands. At the time, Dutch Roman Catholics were disadvantaged and occupied almost no higher posts in governmental and scientific institutions. The establishment of a university was seen as a possible stepping stone for these individuals.

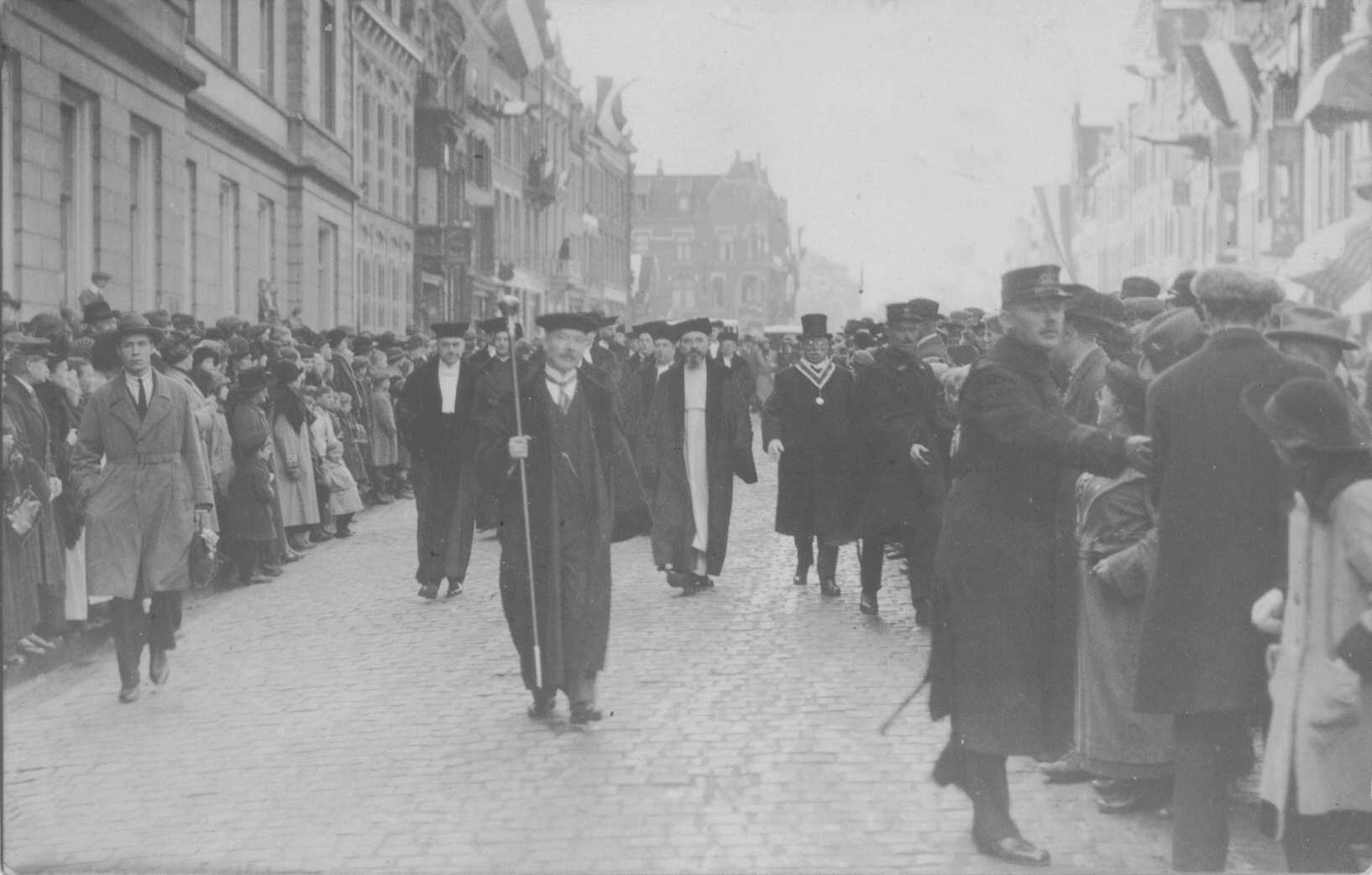
The official opening of the Catholic University of Nijmegen in 1923. The academic beadle walks with the new professors to Saint Ignatius' Church.

When the Catholic University of Nijmegen was founded, every student automatically became part of student corporation N.S.V. Carolus Magnus [nl], named after the Frankish king, Charlemagne, who used to reside in Nijmegen in the Middle Ages. This organization was set up to speak for student needs and to organize an annual induction ceremony. It also aimed at attaining the same status as other corporations in the well-known Dutch student cities of Leiden, Delft and Groningen. To the horror of the Catholic University's management, Carolus Magnus also pursued the same liberal elitist character as these other corporations. Still, it continued developing and students eagerly participated. In the 1920s it produced its own sociëteiten: male students became part of Gentleman's Roland Society (1928) and female students joined the Ladies Society Lumen Ducet (1929). Some students of these sociëteiten banded together in smaller communities called disputen.

=== University in times of war ===
The first years after the establishment of 1923 were quite successful for the Catholic University of Nijmegen, but during the Second World War the young university encountered serious difficulties. Many prominent members were lost, among them the anti-Nazi professors Robert Regout and Titus Brandsma who were deported to Dachau concentration camp and died there. As the war progressed, the university was more severely curtailed in its freedoms. The German Sicherheitsdienst (security service) removed so-called "anti-German works" from the university library. In addition, professors could only be appointed after approval by the Nazi Department of Education, Science and Cultural Protection. Such measures aimed at eventually eliminating religious institutions of higher education. There would be no place for a Catholic university in a Nazified Netherlands.

In March and April 1943, the conflict with the Nazi occupying forces reached a boiling point. The occupiers demanded that all students in the Netherlands sign a declaration of loyalty. If they did not, they were not allowed to continue their studies and had to work in Germany as forced laborers. However, students in Nijmegen showed to be resistant to the German demands. At the risk of his own life, law student Jozef van Hövelleven launched a widespread campaign to get as many students as possible not to sign.

The university's rector magnificus at that time, Bernard Hermesdorf, decided to show solidarity with students like Jozef van Hövell. As the only Dutch rector in the Netherlands he refused, for "reasons of principle", to distribute pre-printed loyalty statements to his students. Although heroic, Hermesdorf's refusal led to extreme anger among the occupying Nazi forces. On 5 May 1943, the Germans demanded all Nijmegen's non-signatories of the loyalty statement to report to Ommen within 24 hours to be put to work in Germany. If they did not, their families would be held responsible. These circumstances left rector magnificus Bernard Hermesdorf with no choice but to close the doors of the university as of 11 April 1943, pending better times. Eventually, only 83 students decided to report to the Germans in Ommen. Most of the students went into hiding, scattered across the Netherlands. The great spider in the web during that time was university moderator Bernard van Ogtrop, who traveled all over the country to visit students from Nijmegen in hiding. He wrote circulars, took care of a wide-ranging correspondence, and ran a parcel service and thus managed to keep many people's spirits up. The university was closed, but thanks to Van Ogtrop it continued to exist, if only in the minds of the students.

=== 1945–2000 ===
When the war ended in 1945, the university infrastructure had been largely destroyed, but students still returned to their alma mater in dribs and drabs. Classes officially resumed again in March 1946, but because many university buildings had been bombed during the war, a dire need for new facilities existed. With the purchase of the Heyendaal estate, the university got its own campus in a green setting less than a fifteen-minute bike ride from the Nijmegen city center. In 1951, the Faculty of Medical Sciences was the first faculty to move to Heyendaal. Soon, other faculties followed. By 1988, all faculties had moved to Heyendaal. The move to a new campus also with a rise in students attending the Catholic University of Nijmegen. Since the end of the war, student numbers steadily rose from 3,000 in 1960 to 15,000 in 1980.

The period between 1960 and 1975 is often generally described as the "Age of Student Unrest". Not only did the student population in Nijmegen rise exponentially, it had also become more diverse, left-leaning and less elitist. Next to that, the hippie movement had reached the city which caused many students to desire a more democratic student life. Umbrella organization Carolus Magnus became increasingly bloated and lost connection with the members of sociëteiten and disputen that began to operate more independently. It was not the beloved corporation it used to be and students criticized the mandatory membership of Carolus Magnus. Therefore, the organization slowly became more concerned with administrative duties than organizing community activities. In 1966 Carolus Magnus ceased to exist in its traditional sense. From that moment on, students were free to choose which association they joined and which not. In the 1980s and 1990s many other kinds of student associations were established in Nijmegen, including evangelical-Christian association Navigators, egalitarian association Ovum Novum, and alternative student association Karpe Noktum.

=== 2000–present ===
As an indication of its evolving relationship with the Bishops' Conference of the Netherlands and to appear less sectarian, the university's executive council changed the university's name in 2004 to the Radboud University Nijmegen after Saint Radboud of Utrecht, a medieval bishop. Tensions continued between the university's executive council and the bishops' conference over the secularizing direction of the university. The repeated nomination of non-Catholics and non-practicing Catholics to the executive council, which the bishops' conference would not approve, exacerbated tensions. In response to a decision to open a Transgender Care Center at the university's medical center, the bishops' conference revoked the designation Catholic from the university in November 2020. Accordingly, the university lost its eligibility to receive church subsidies and its right to identify as Roman Catholic. The university appealed to the Holy See, and in November 2022 the pope's Dicastery for Culture and Education ruled that the bishops' conference could remove the designation "Catholic" from the executive council but not from the university as a whole.

== Faculties ==
Radboud University is organized in seven faculties that offer programmes and courses in the fields of humanities, social sciences, natural sciences, medical sciences, law, management, philosophy, theology and religious studies. Each faculty (cf., College in the USA or School in Europe) is a formal grouping of academic degree programmes, schools and institutes, discipline areas, research centres, and/or any combination of these drawn together for educational purposes.

- Faculty of Arts
- Faculty of Law
- Faculty of Medical Sciences
- Nijmegen School of Management
- Faculty of Philosophy, Theology and Religious Studies
- Faculty of Science
- Faculty of Social Sciences

== Campus ==
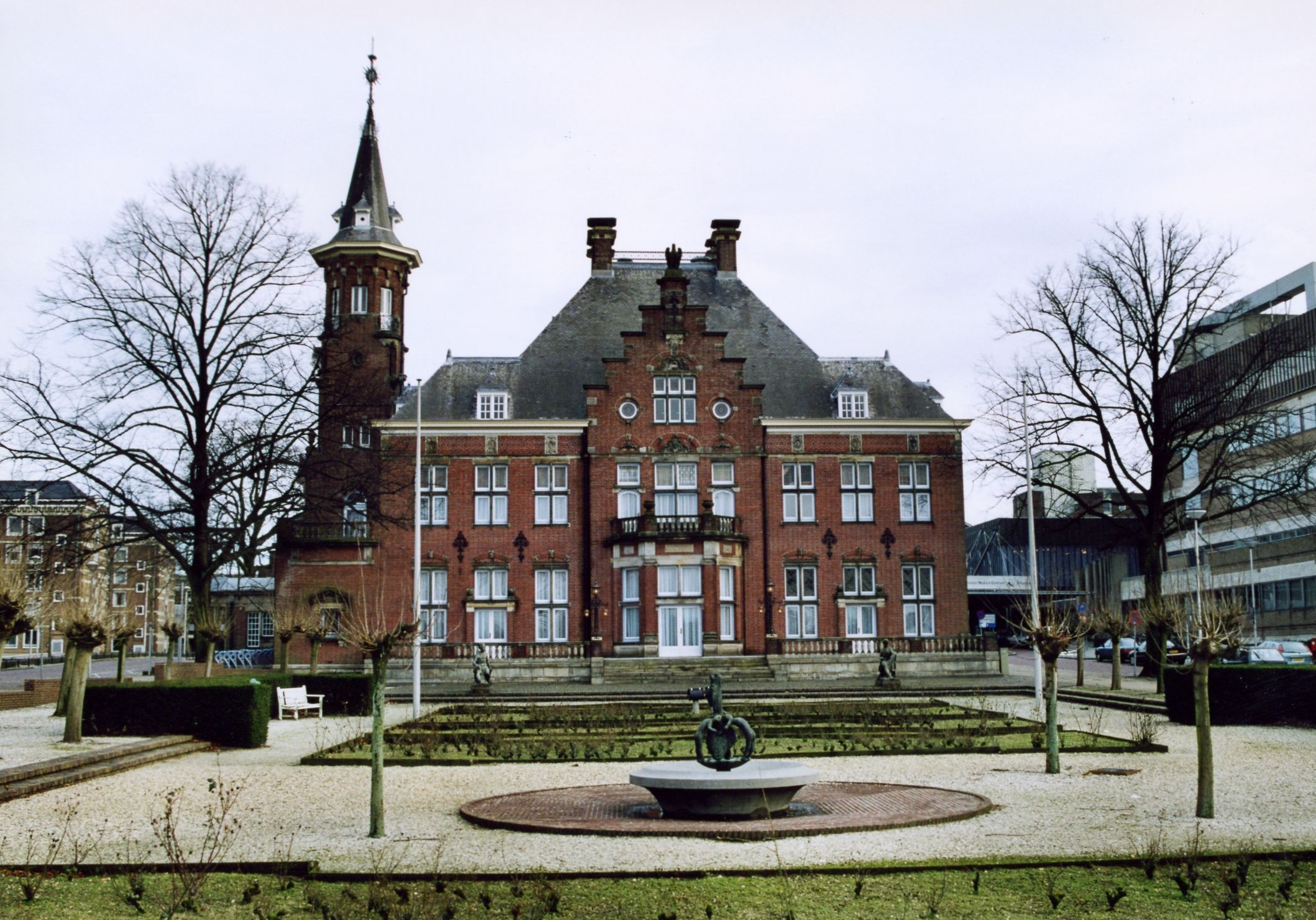
Heyendaal castle (now serving as the Faculty Club of the university) is of old the center of Heyendaal estate, where later on most Radboud University buildings have been established.

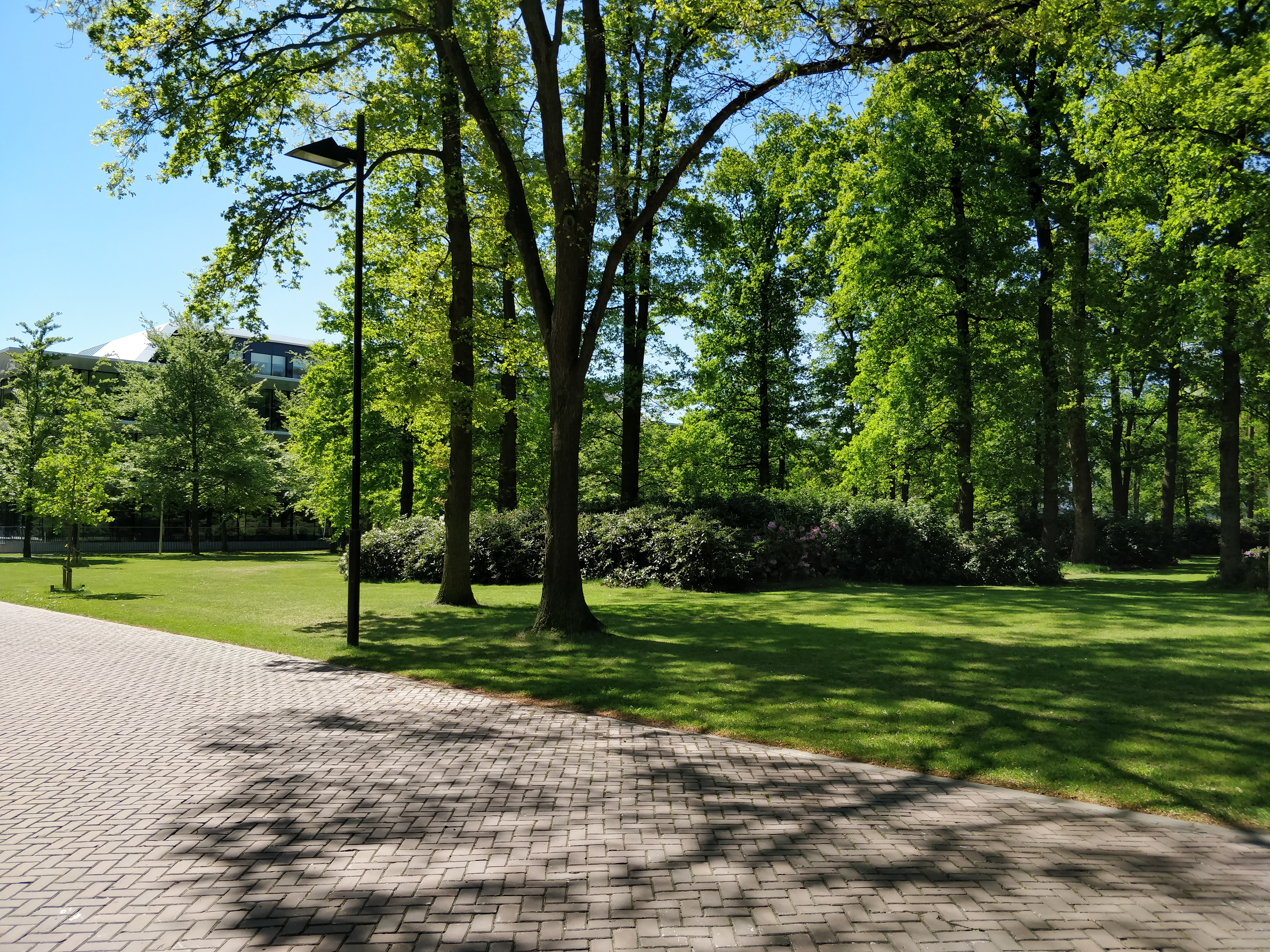
A view of the Radboud University law faculty in the summer

Radboud University is noted for its green campus, often listed among the most attractive in the Netherlands. The campus is located in the southern Heyendaal estate of Nijmegen and houses 7 faculties that conduct teaching and research. In addition to these faculties, the campus also hosts the Max Planck Institute for Psycholinguistics, a world class research centre devoted to the understanding of human language and communication.

Featured prominently on the northwest side of the university's Heyendaal campus is the Heyendaal castle. It borders the Radboud University Medical Center, a large teaching hospital located on the campus, which is linked to the university's medical department. Bordering the university hospital is the Huygens Building, which houses the Faculty of Natural Sciences. At the south end of the campus next to the Radboud Sports Centre (RSC), one finds the Erasmus Tower which houses the Faculty of Arts and Philosophy, Theology and Religion. The Erasmus Tower and the RSC border the Elinor Ostrom building, which is home to the School of Management and also encompasses the political sciences and economics faculty staff. On the other side of the Erasmus Tower, a number of general lecture halls is located along with the campus pub and bookshop. Beyond this area, in the southwest of the campus, one finds the modern Maria Montessori building, home to the Faculty of Social Sciences, and the Grotius building, home to the Faculty of Law. In the most southern part of the campus, the monumental Jesuit Berchmanianum monastery can be found which houses the university's general services staff and will serve as its auditorium.

In 2017, a SPAR minimarket was opened in the Erasmus building which provides students with snacks and accessories. The university campus borders the campus of the HAN University of Applied Sciences, which in turn is located next to Heyendaal train station. Frequent shuttle buses connect the university to Nijmegen Central Station and the city centre.

== Academics ==
=== Education ===
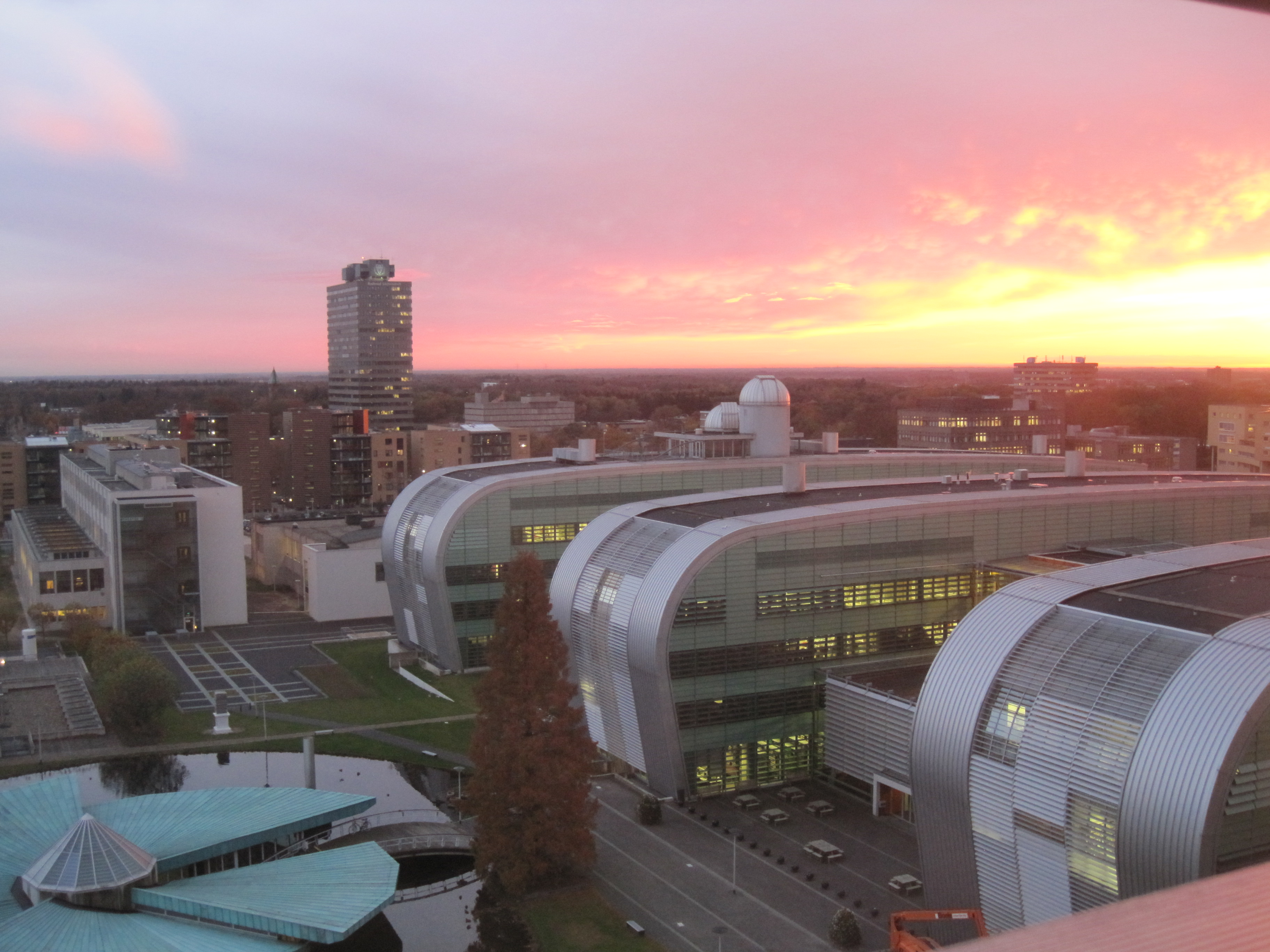
An aerial view of the Huygens buildings of the Faculty of Natural Sciences, with the Erasmus Tower in the back

Radboud University enrols over 24,000 students in about one hundred study programs (about 50 bachelor's and 50 master's programs). As of April 2021, the university offers 34 international master's programs taught in English and several more taught in Dutch. There are nine bachelor's programs taught fully in English: American Studies, Artificial Intelligence, Biology, Chemistry, Computing Science, International Economics & Business, International Business Administration, English Language and Culture, Philosophy, Politics and Society and Molecular Life Sciences. Communication and Information Studies, History, Psychology and Arts and Culture Studies offer English-language tracks. All other bachelors are in Dutch, although most of the required literature is in English. Some exams, papers and even classes may be in English as well, despite the programs being Dutch-taught. All master's programs have been internationally accredited by the Accreditation Organization of the Netherlands and Flanders (NVAO).

==== International master's programs ====
All English-taught master's programmes are research-based programmes. They are taught within the Faculties of Arts, Law, Social Sciences, Medical Sciences, Sciences and Philosophy, Theology and Religious Studies, besides the Interfaculty Research school and the Nijmegen School of Management.

=== Research ===
Radboud University is home to several research institutions, including the Business & Law Research Centre, Institute for Management Research, NanoLab Nijmegen, the Donders Institute for Brain, Cognition and Behaviour and HFML-FELIX. Faculty members Anne Cutler (1999), Henk Barendregt (2002), Peter Hagoort (2005), Theo Rasing (2008), Heino Falcke (2011), Mike Jetten (2012), Ieke Moerdijk (2012), Mikhail Katsnelson (2013), Wilhelm Huck (2016) and Klaas Landsman (2022) won the Spinoza Prize. Visiting professor Sir Andre Geim and former PhD student Sir Konstantin Novoselov were awarded the 2010 Nobel Prize in Physics.

=== University ranking ===
University rankings

Global – Overall
- ARWU World: 101–150 (2024)
- QS World: 279 (2026)
- THE World: =143 (2025)
- USNWR Global: =117 (2025)

Radboud University has been named best broad university in the Netherlands for the past seven consecutive years. The physics department is considered top tier. A recent accomplishment is its contribution to the first picture of a black hole. The Faculty of Law is nationally unrivaled in its research in business and law, and retains strong international ties with other prominent research institutions, such as Bologna, Nice and Oxford. The Faculty of Law's European Law School and Notarial Law departments are considered best in class in the Netherlands, just as the Political Sciences, Sociology and Theology programmes in their respective fields.

=== Radboud Excellence Initiative ===
The Radboud Excellence Initiative was created with the dual purposes of attracting talents from every academic field to Radboud University while strengthening international bonds between universities worldwide. The initiative is a joint enterprise of both Radboud University and Radboud University Nijmegen Medical Center. It provides two routes by which a researcher may come to Radboud University. Promising researchers who have completed their doctorate between two and eight years earlier at the time of nomination may be nominated for a fellowship whereas those researchers who are more established in their discipline may be nominated for a professorship.

== Student life ==
=== Student associations ===
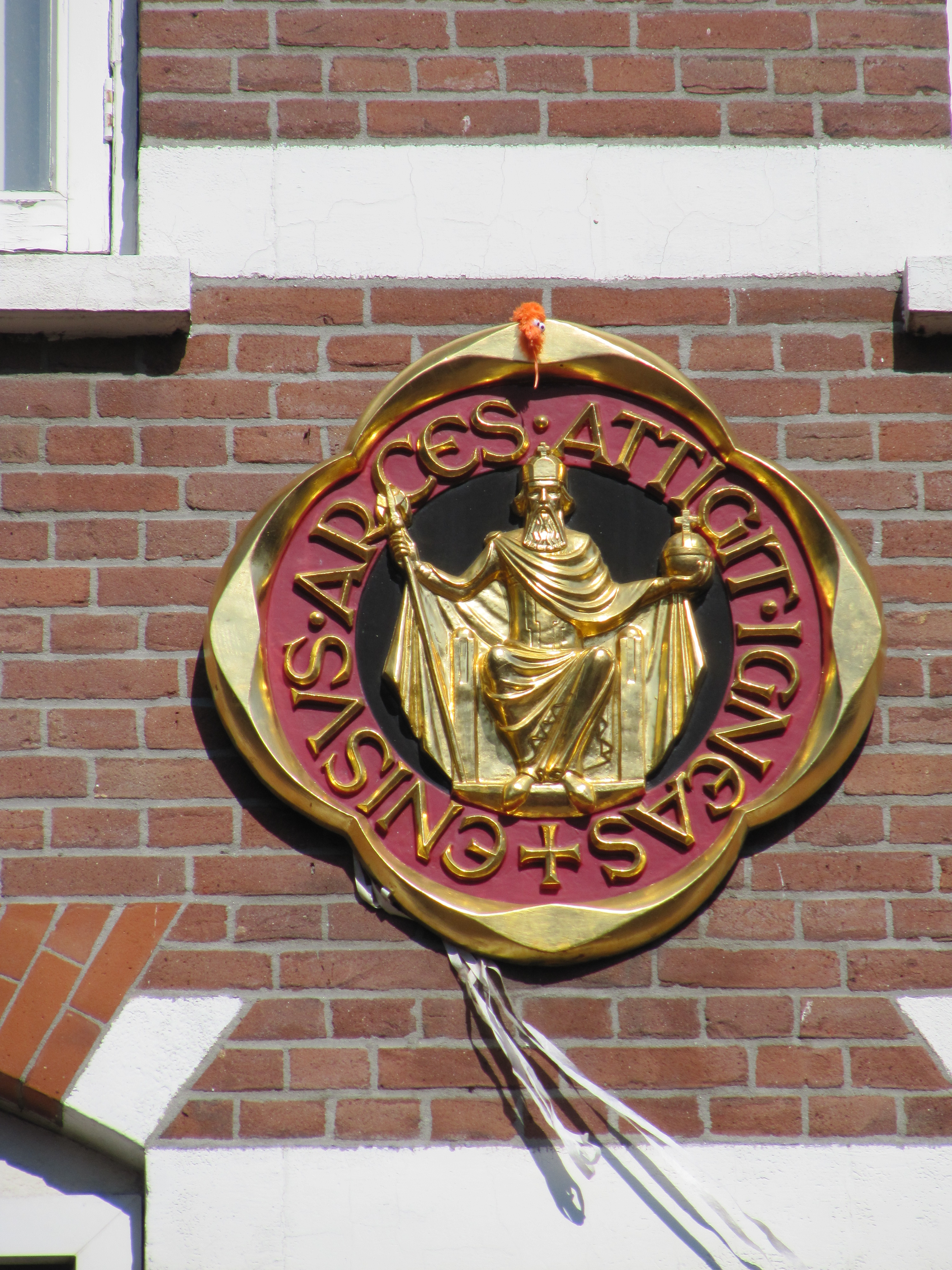
Emblem of the traditional student association Carolus Magnus

Radboud University offers students the opportunity to join various ethnic, cultural and political organizations, along with numerous honor societies, special interest groups and socially focused student societies.

Overview of the largest student associations in Nijmegen
Student association	Date of establishment	Members	Type of Association
N.S.V. Carolus Magnus	1 February 1928 (revival in 1973)	600	Traditional
N.S.R.V. Phocas	1 May 1947	550	Rowing-oriented
N.S.H.C. Apeliotes	8 October 1987	500	Field hockey-oriented
N.S.Z.V. De Loefbijter	23 February 1967	75	Sailing-oriented
A.E.G.E.E. Nijmegen	22 August 1986	85	International
N.S.N. (Navigators)	2 November 1989	215	Christian
V.G.S.N. Thesaurum Quaeritans	21 March 1990	53	Reformed (Liberated)
N.S.V. Ovum Novum	20 May 1990	630	Egalitarian
K.S.N. – Katholieke Studenten Nijmegen	21 August 2000	23	Catholic
A.S.V. Karpe Noktem	7 December 2004	140	Alternative
C.S.F.R. Quo Vadis	27 October 2009	50	Reformed
N.S.R.V. Obelix	1 May 1970	100	Rugby-oriented

=== Study associations ===
Lately study associations have overtaken part of the role that student associations like Carolus Magnus used to play. These study associations are related to individual degree programs and are open to international students as well. Study associations don't have initiation rituals and regularly meet for fun-related, as well as study-related activities. Some examples of study associations are the study association for computing science and information sciences students (Thalia), the study association for history students (GSV Excalibur), the study association for English Language and Culture (T.E.A. The English Association), the study association for psychology students (SPIN), and the study association for Business Administration students (Synergy).

=== Campus publications ===
Radboud University's independent university media platform, Vox, intended for students and staff, publishes daily material online and delivers hard copy magazines several times a year. Its paper magazine is distributed on campus for free. Vox at Radboud University also produce an independent student magazine that appears seven times a year: the Algemeen Nijmeegs Studentenblad (ANS).

=== Athletics ===
Radboud University offers many facilities for sports at the Radboud Sports Centre (RSC) a part of campus where students are welcomed 7 days a week to partake in a variety of at least 80 different sports. In addition to the facilities of the Radboud Sports Centre, Radboud University also boasts more than 35 student sports associations such as the Radboud Rangers (baseball), Obelix (rugby), Apelliotes (hockey), FC Kunde (soccer), Phocas (rowing) and De Loefbijter (sailing).

== Notable alumni ==
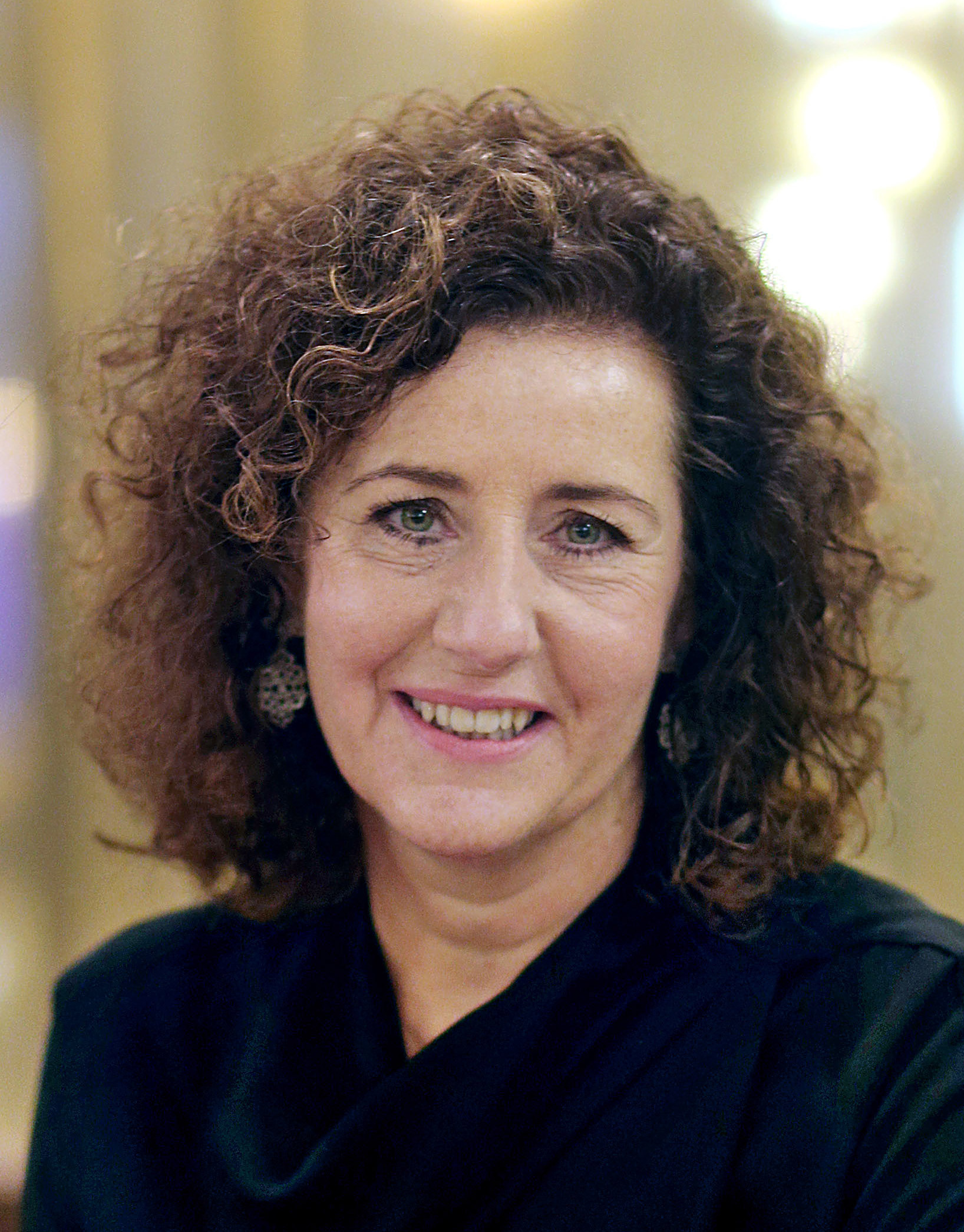
Ingrid van Engelshoven

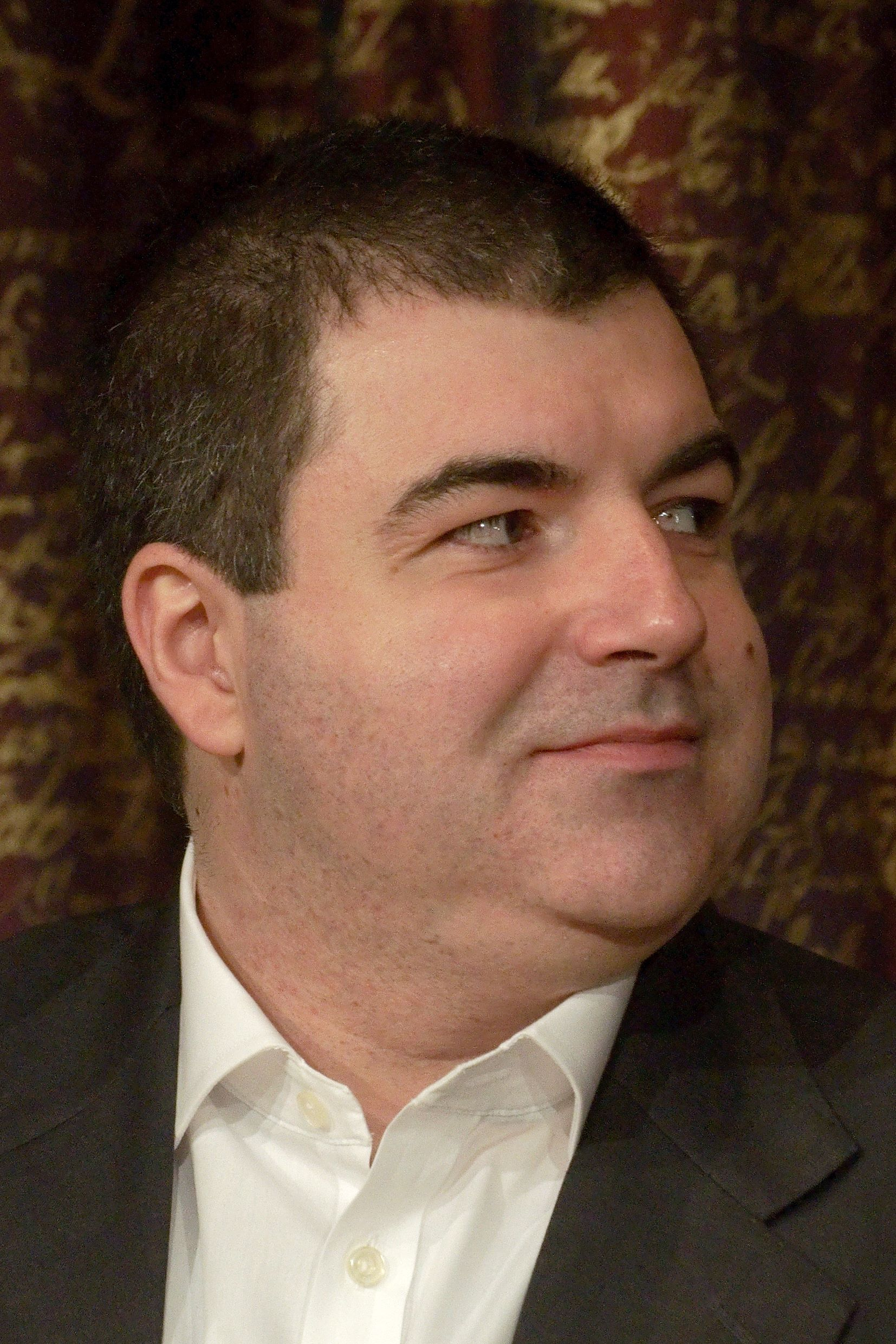
Konstantin Novoselov

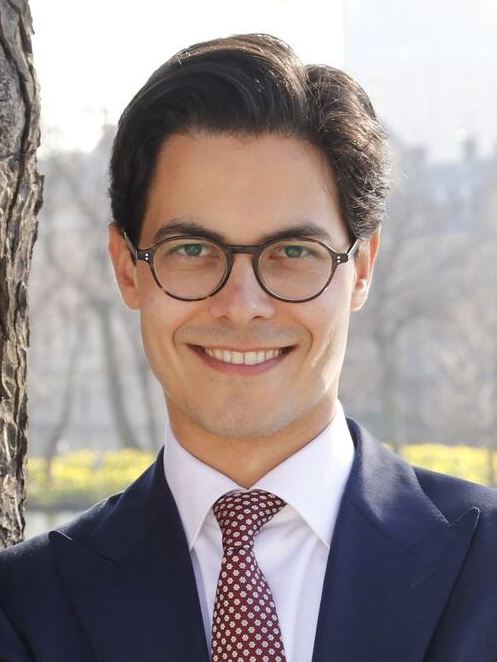
Rob Jetten

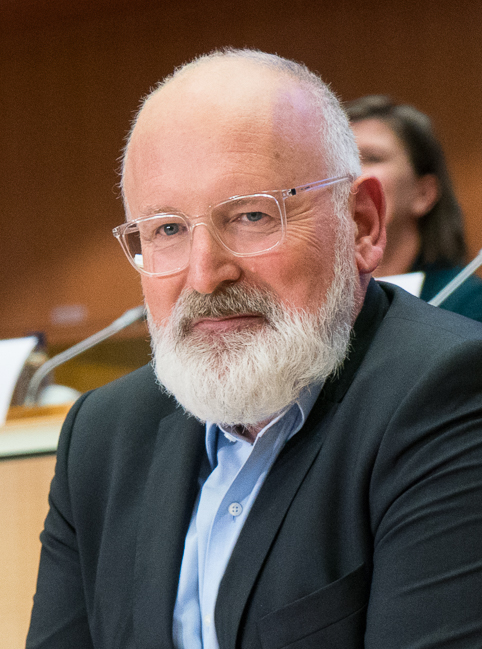
Frans Timmermans

The following is a partial list of notable alumni of Radboud University:

=== Politics ===
- Dries van Agt (1955, LLM) – 46th Prime Minister of the Netherlands
- Gracita Arrindell – first woman President of Sint Maarten.
- Louis Beel (1928, LLM) – 36th Prime Minister of the Netherlands
- Jo Cals (1940, LLM) – 41st Prime Minister of the Netherlands
- Ingrid van Engelshoven (1989, MSc) – former Dutch Minister of Education, Culture and Science
- Thom de Graaf (1981, LLM) – former mayor of Nijmegen
- Loek Hermans (1976, MSc) – former Dutch Minister of Education, Culture and Science
- Rob Jetten (2011, MSc) - leader of Democrats 66 and current Prime Minister of the Netherlands
- Agnes Kant (1989, MSc & 1997, PhD) – former leader of the Dutch Socialist Party
- Jos van der Lans (1981, MA) – former member of the Dutch House of Representatives
- Gerd Leers, (1976, MSc) – former mayor of Maastricht, Minister for Immigration and Asylum Affairs
- Victor Marijnen (1941, LLM) – 39th Prime Minister of the Netherlands
- Lilian Marijnissen (2006, MSc) – leader of the Dutch Socialist Party
- Hans van Mierlo (1960, LLM) – former Dutch Minister of Foreign Affairs
- Dick Schoof (1957, MSc) – civil servant and 51st Prime Minister of the Netherlands
- Frans Timmermans (1985, MA) – Dutch politician and diplomat who currently serves as the First Vice-President of the European Commission and the European Commissioner for the portfolio of Better Regulation, Inter-Institutional Relations, Rule of Law and Charter of Fundamental Rights in the Juncker Commission.
- Rita Verdonk (1983, MA) – former Dutch Minister for Immigration and Asylum Affairs, former member of the Dutch House of Representatives

=== Academics ===
- Anna Akhmanova (1999, PhD) – cell biologist and winner of the 2018 Spinoza Prize
- Wim Crusio (1984, PhD) – neurobehavioural geneticist
- Jos Engelen (1973, MSc & 1979, PhD) – experimental physicist
- Halleh Ghorashi (2001, PhD) – Iranian-born anthropologist, member of the Royal Netherlands Academy of Arts and Sciences
- Jaap van Ginneken (born 1943) - psychologist and communication scholar
- Wim Klever (born 1930) - scholar, specializing in Baruch Spinoza's philosophy.
- Gerard Luttikhuizen (born 1940) - scholar
- Johan Mekkes (1898–1987) - philosopher
- Karel Martens (1967, PhD) - Transport and Spatial planner, developer of Transport Justice theory, dean of the Facultry of Architecture and Town Planning in the Technion.
- Sir Konstantin Novoselov (PhD) – discoverer of graphene, awarded 2010 Nobel Prize in Physics.
- Harald E.L. Prins (1976, Doctorandus) anthropologist, ethnohistorian, documentary filmmaker and expert witness on indigenous rights in United States and Canadian courts, distinguished Professor of Anthropology at Kansas State University
- Frans de Waal (1970, MSc) – biologist and primatologist known for his work on the behavior and social intelligence of primates.

=== Business ===
- Yuri Bobbert (2018, PhD) - cybersecurity executive, academic, and entrepreneur
- Marijn Emmanuel Dekkers, (1979, BSc) – Chief Executive Officer of Bayer (2010–2016) and Unilever (2016–2019)
- Aart Jan de Geus (1981, LMM) – Chief Executive Officer of the Bertelsmann Stiftung and chairman of the Triodos Bank
- Louis Reijtenbagh (1975, MSc) – founder and Chief Executive Officer of The Plaza Group
- Herna Verhagen, (1988, LLM) – Chief Executive Officer of PostNL, most influential Dutch woman 2014

=== Sports ===
- Karapet Karapetyan (2011, LLM) – Armenian-Dutch kickboxer, ranked #3 welterweight in the world in November 2015 by GLORY
- Björn Kuipers (2001, MSc) – football referee, leader of multiple UEFA Europa League finals and the 2014 UEFA Champions League Final
- Koen Metsemakers (2019, MSc) – rower, winner of a golden medal in the men's quad scull in the 2020 Summer Olympics in Tokyo, Japan
- Nelleke Penninx (1998, MSc) – rower, winner of a silver medal in the women's eight with coxswain in the 2000 Summer Olympics in Sydney, Australia
- Annemarieke van Rumpt (2004, MSc) – rower, winner of a bronze medal in the women's four coxless in the 2004 Summer Olympics in Milan, Italy

=== Literature ===
- Godfried Bomans (1943, not completed) – popular Dutch author, famous for his children fantasy novel "Eric in the Land of the Insects"
- A. F. Th. van der Heijden (1976, BA) – popular Dutch author, most known for his multi-novel saga De tandeloze tijd ("The Toothless Time")
- Henri Nouwen (1964, MSc) – Catholic priest and writer, most known for his book "The Return of the Prodigal Son"
- Mark Retera (1989, MSc) – popular Dutch cartoonist, best known for his absurd gag comic DirkJan

== Notable faculty ==
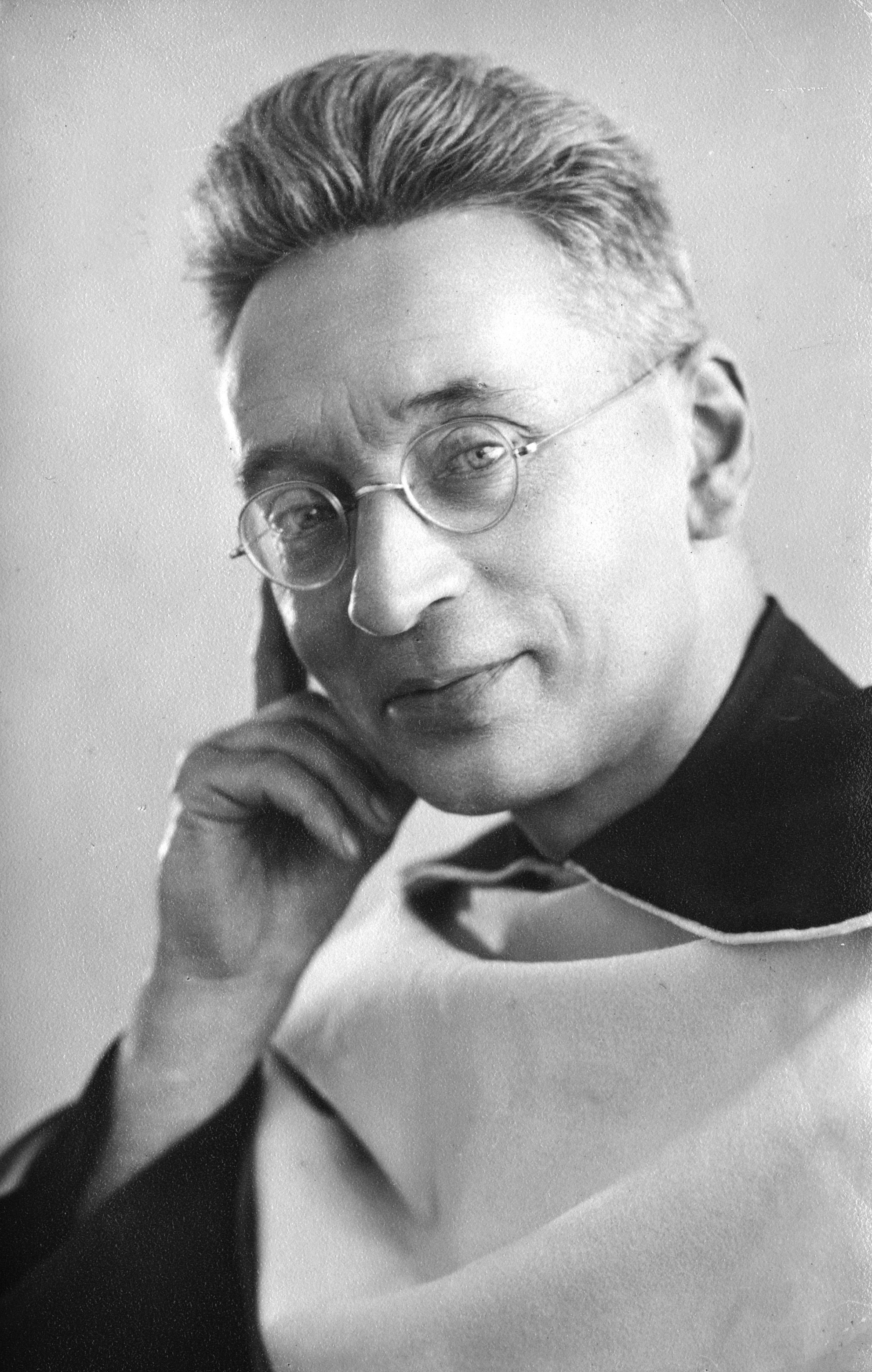
Titus Brandsma

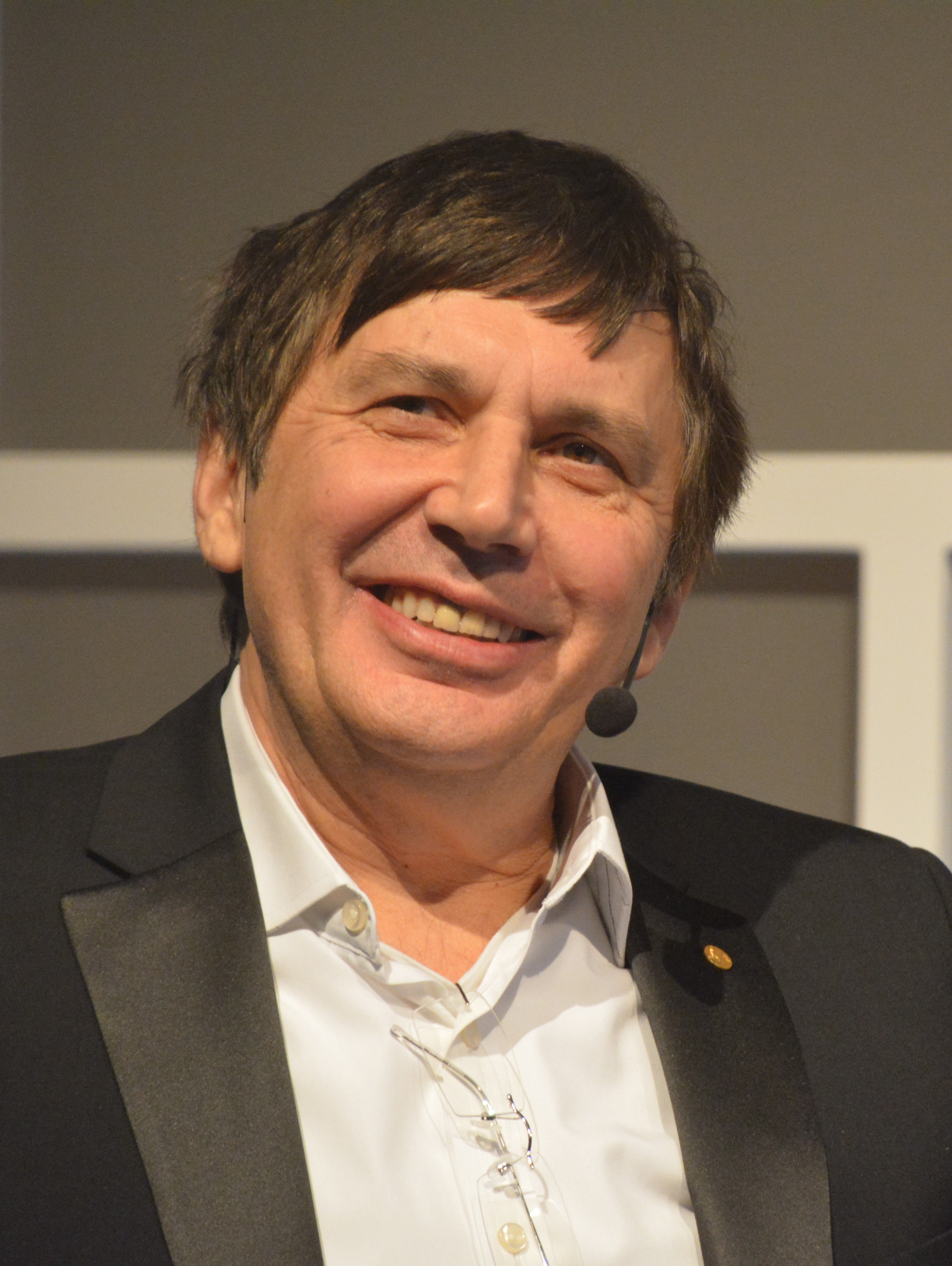
Andre Geim

The following is a partial list of notable faculty of Radboud University:

- Esther Aarts, neuroscientist
- Hans van Abeelen, first Dutch behaviour geneticist
- Titus Brandsma, co-founder, murdered in Dachau concentration camp
- Andreas Burnier, writer
- Joan Daemen, cryptographer, developed AES and SHA-3
- Ap Dijksterhuis, social psychologist and author of "Het slimme onbewuste"
- Willem Duynstee, Rector (1940/1941), Philosophical Psychology (Mortification Therapy), Lawyer, and Moral Theologian
- Heino Falcke, German professor of radio astronomy and astroparticle physics
- Andre Geim, Russian-born Dutch–British physicist, joint winner of the 2010 Nobel Prize in Physics
- Carlos Gussenhoven, professor of linguistics, specializes in phonetics and phonology
- Catharina Halkes, first feminist theologian to be a professor in the Netherlands
- Hans de Kroon, biologist
- Marc Lewis, psychologist, neuroscientist and author
- Renate Loll, physicist, developed the theory of Causal Dynamical Triangulations.
- Jos van der Meer, professor of general internal medicine
- Mihai Netea, physician, awarded the Spinoza Prize of 2016
- Ton Tekstra, professor of fiscal insolvency law
- Kees Versteegh, professor emeritus of Middle Eastern studies, also alumnus
- Roos Vonk, social psychologist and author of popular scientific works
- Jan van der Watt, expert in Johannine literature, General editor of Review of Biblical Literature
- Heiman Wertheim, medical microbiologist, expert on antimicrobial resistance
- Daniela Wilson, chemist known for her work on nanomotors

== See also ==
- Hogeschool van Arnhem en Nijmegen, a University of Applied Sciences located in Nijmegen and Arnhem
- List of early modern universities in Europe
- Outline of organizational theory
