= Daniela Wilson =

Dutch chemist

- Born: Daniela Apreutesei; Comănești, Romania
- Education: Gheorghe Asachi Technical University of Iași
- Known for: Systems Chemistry, Polymersomes, Artificial cells and organelles, Nanomedicine, Self-assembly
- Awards: 2016 NWO Aspasia, 2015 NWO Athena Award
- Scientific career
- Fields: Organic Chemistry; Polymer Chemistry; Materials Science; Nanotechnology
- Workplaces: Radboud University Nijmegen, 2010–present University of Pennsylvania, 2007–2010; Gheorghe Asachi Technical University of Iași, 2003–2007
- Thesis: Research into the relationship between structure and properties in mesogenic systems (2007)
- Website: https://www.ru.nl/systemschemistry/people/content/prof-dr-daniela-wilson/

Daniela A. Wilson is a Romanian scientist of organic chemistry known for her research regarding self-assembly, polymer chemistry and nanomotors. She currently holds the position of professor of systems chemistry at Radboud University Nijmegen and holds a chair at the Institute for Molecules and Materials.

== Education ==
Daniela Wilson received her higher education in Iași, completing her BSc degree in Chemistry and Physics with distinction at the Gheorghe Asachi Technical University in 2001 and an MSc in Environmental Chemistry with distinction at Alexandru Ioan Cuza University in 2003. She subsequently obtained her PhD in macro-molecular chemistry from Gheorghe Asachi in 2007 under the supervision of Dan Scutaru. Her doctoral thesis on "research into the relationship between structure and properties in mesogenic systems" was awarded summa cum laude.

== Career ==
Wilson moved to the United States in 2007 as a research fellow at University of Pennsylvania where she joined the group of Professor Virgil Percec. In 2010 Wilson moved to the Netherlands where she initially worked with Jan van Hest and Roeland Nolte. In 2012 Wilson was made assistant professor in Bio-organic chemistry and tenured in 2016. After a brief period as associate professor she became acting head of Bio-organic chemistry in 2016 and was appointed as full professor to set up a group in systems chemistry at Radboud University Nijmegen in 2017.

== Research ==
Her early career focused on studying the effects of shape on the self-assembly of liquid crystalline materials, and methodology in organic synthesis utilising nickel mediated cross-coupling reactions. Wilson's research into the development of self-assembled nanomotors involves the design of tiny motors that can move autonomously in specific environments, and on developing nanocarriers that respond to various stimuli such as pH, temperature, or light. A 2017 article in the Irish Times talked about how these nano-devises could be used to deliver drugs in the human body.

== Selected publications ==
- Percec, Virgil; Wilson, Daniela A.; Leowanawat, Pawaret; Wilson, Christopher J.; Hughes, Andrew D.; Kaucher, Mark S.; Hammer, Daniel A.; Levine, Dalia H.; Kim, Anthony J.; Bates, Frank S.; Davis, Kevin P.; Lodge, Timothy P.; Klein, Michael L.; DeVane, Russell H.; Aqad, Emad (2010-05-21). "Self-Assembly of Janus Dendrimers into Uniform Dendrimersomes and Other Complex Architectures". Science. 328 (5981): 1009–1014. Bibcode:2010Sci...328.1009P. doi:10.1126/science.1185547. ISSN 0036-8075. PMID 20489021.
- Wilson, Daniela A.; Wilson, Christopher J.; Moldoveanu, Costel; Resmerita, Ana-Maria; Corcoran, Patrick; Hoang, Lisa M.; Rosen, Brad M.; Percec, Virgil (2010-02-17). "Neopentylglycolborylation of Aryl Mesylates and Tosylates Catalyzed by Ni-Based Mixed-Ligand Systems Activated with Zn". Journal of the American Chemical Society. 132 (6): 1800–1801. Bibcode:2010JAChS.132.1800W. doi:10.1021/ja910808x. ISSN 0002-7863. PMID 20095554.
- Rosen, Brad M.; Quasdorf, Kyle W.; Wilson, Daniella A.; Zhang, Na; Resmerita, Ana-Maria; Garg, Neil K.; Percec, Virgil (2011-03-09). "Nickel-Catalyzed Cross-Couplings Involving Carbon−Oxygen Bonds". Chemical Reviews. 111 (3): 1346–1416. doi:10.1021/cr100259t. ISSN 0009-2665. PMC 3055945. PMID 21133429.
- Wilson, Daniela A.; Nolte, Roeland J.M.; van Hest, Jan C. M. (2012). "Autonomous movement of platinum-loaded stomatocytes". Nature Chemistry. 4 (4): 268–274. Bibcode:2012NatCh...4..268W. doi:10.1038/nchem.1281. ISSN 1755-4330. PMID 22437710.
- Zhang, Shaohua; Li, Wei; Luan, Jiabin; Srivastava, Abhinav; Carnevale, Vincenzo; Klein, Michael L.; Sun, Jiawei; Wang, Danni; Teora, Serena P.; Rijpkema, Sjoerd J.; Meeldijk, Johannes D.; Wilson, Daniela A. (2023). "Adaptive insertion of a hydrophobic anchor into a poly(ethylene glycol) host for programmable surface functionalization". Nature Chemistry. 15 (2): 240–247. Bibcode:2023NatCh..15..240Z. doi:10.1038/s41557-022-01090-0. ISSN 1755-4330. PMC 9899690. PMID 36411361.

== Awards and honors ==
Wilson received the 2015 NWO Science Athena award for outstanding female researchers. In 2016 she received the NML Researcher Award from Nano-Micro Letters.
