= Esther Aarts =

Cognitive neuroscientist

Esther Aarts Prof. Dr.
- Born: 1980; Eindhoven, Netherlands
- Education: Radboud University, Donders Institute
- Scientific career
- Fields: biology, cognitive neuroscience, gut-brain axis, microbiome, nutrition
- Workplaces: Donders Institute
- Thesis: "Resisting Temptation: The Role of the Anterior Cingulate Cortex in Adjusting Cognitive Control" (2008)

Esther Aarts is a cognitive neuroscientist working at the Donders Institute for Brain, Cognition, and Behaviour. Aarts is known for her work on how food affects brain function, including research on the gut-brain axis, nutritional neuroscience, and obesity.

== Education and career ==
Aarts was born in Eindhoven in 1980. She studied biology at Radboud University in Nijmegen, then completed a M.Sc. in Neurobiology in 2004. She obtained her Ph.D. in Cognitive Neurosciences at the Donders Institute for Brain, Cognition, and Behaviour in 2009 under supervision of Ardi Roelofs and Miranda van Turennout.

Between 2008 and 2010, Aarts held a postdoctoral psychiatry position with Roshan Cools at Radboud University Medical Center. Afterwards, she got a Niels Stensen postdoctoral fellow position at University of California, Berkeley with Mark D'Esposito until 2012. In 2012, Aarts returned to the Cools lab, specialising on the effects of food reward on cognition. Aarts has held her role as an associate principal investigator and coordinator of the Food & Cognition research group at the Donders Institute since 2017. In 2022, she was appointed as a full professor of Nutritional Neuroscience at the Faculty of Sciences of Radboud University.

== Research ==
Aarts' early research investigated motivational control associated with poor eating habits, as she studied how variations in the activation of certain brain regions that are dopamine-rich predict whether someone will put effort into getting a sugary reward when they are no longer hungry. More recent research investigates the behaviour of people towards food from a decisional and motivational perspective, and seeks to understand the effects that food decisions and emotions have on brain and behaviour in obesity, in aging and in psychiatric conditions. In studying these effects of food on brain functioning she takes the gut microbiome and the immune system into account. To examine body-brain connections, Aarts uses brain scans (functional MRI), biological measurements, and interventions with food supplements, medication, or lifestyle coaching.

== Selected publications ==
- Kohn, N.; Szopinska-Tokov, J.; Llera Arenas, A.; Beckmann, C.F.; Arias-Vasquez, A.; Aarts, E (2021-01-01). "Multivariate associative patterns between the gut microbiota and large-scale brain network connectivity". Gut Microbes. 13 (1). doi:10.1080/19490976.2021.2006586. ISSN 1949-0976. PMC 8726725. PMID 34856861.
- Duif, Iris; Wegman, Joost; Mars, Monica M; de Graaf, Cees; Smeets, Paul AM; Aarts, Esther (2020). "Effects of distraction on taste-related neural processing: a cross-sectional fMRI study". The American Journal of Clinical Nutrition. 111 (5): 950–961. doi:10.1093/ajcn/nqaa032. PMC 7198299. PMID 32173737.
- Papalini, S.; Michels, F.; Kohn, N.; Wegman, J.; van Hemert, S.; Roelofs, K.; Arias-Vasquez, A.; Aarts, E. (2019-02-01). "Stress matters: Randomized controlled trial on the effect of probiotics on neurocognition". Neurobiology of Stress. 10 100141. doi:10.1016/j.ynstr.2018.100141. ISSN 2352-2895. PMC 6430409. PMID 30937347.
- Wegman, Joost; van Loon, Ilke; Smeets, Paul A. M.; Cools, Roshan; Aarts, Esther (2018-06-01). "Top-down expectation effects of food labels on motivation". NeuroImage. 173: 13–24. doi:10.1016/j.neuroimage.2018.02.011. hdl:2066/191075. ISSN 1053-8119. PMID 29438844.
- Janssen, Lieneke K.; Duif, Iris; van Loon, Ilke; Wegman, Joost; de Vries, Jeanne H. M.; Cools, Roshan; Aarts, Esther (2017-02-01). "Loss of lateral prefrontal cortex control in food-directed attention and goal-directed food choice in obesity". NeuroImage. 146: 148–156. doi:10.1016/j.neuroimage.2016.11.015. hdl:2066/166354. ISSN 1053-8119. PMID 27845255.
