= Retera =

Retera is a surname. Notable people with the surname include:

- Mark Retera (born 1964), Dutch cartoonist
- Dennis Retera (born 1986), Dutch racing driver
