= Robert Regout =

Robert Regout may refer to:

- Robert Regout (Jesuit) (1896–1942), Dutch Jesuit, jurist, and resistance fighter
- Robert Regout (politician) (1863–1913), Dutch politician
