= DirkJan =

- Main characters Bert and DirkJan on the cover of album 2
- Author: Mark Retera
- Website: dirkjan.nl
- Current status/schedule: Running
- Launch date: 1989
- Publisher(s): Eppo, Veronica Magazine, Dagblad van het Noorden, Algemeen Dagblad
- Genre(s): Humor comics, Satire, Gag cartoon

DirkJan is a Dutch comic strip series, created in 1989 by Dutch author and artist Mark Retera. It is also the name of its main character. The series is a gag-a-day comic.

== Description ==
DirkJan is an underachiever who stumbles through life in mostly three-panel gag-a-day comic strips. He started out in 1989 as a student at the current Radboud University Nijmegen in the Netherlands, where he lived in a typical student house with all the stereotypical sidekicks, such as the frat boy, the beer drinker, the bossy girl who checks if everybody keeps to the house rules, and the tramps who use the heated shared hallway to stay the night. Early DirkJans contained many references to the student life of Nijmegen.

== Publication ==
DirkJan was first published in Critic, the magazine for the local union of psychology students. It then moved on to monthly publication in the student magazine of Nijmegen (Algemeen Nijmeegs Studentenblad, ANS). DirkJan became known nationally when the then only commercial comics magazine of the Netherlands SjoSji (now defunct) started publishing the strip.

With the last move, the nature of the strip changed. Most of the student sidekicks got cancelled and DirkJan left university, first for jail (DJ is a notorious Kabouter abuser) and then to wander the globe and indeed space.

As of May 2023, there are 28 DirkJan albums, tentatively named 'DirkJan 1' through 'DirkJan 22'. Several newspapers in the Netherlands publish the comic in their daily edition. There are 8 more albums outside the regular series.

The amateur comics magazine Iris (1990–1995) republished a number of DirkJan comics, some of which were refused for publication in SjoSji.
