= Willem Duynstee =

Dutch Catholic priest (1886–1968)

- Born: 6 September 1886; Sittard, Netherlands
- Died: 8 November 1968 (aged 82); Menton, France
- Education: Universiteit van Amsterdam (LLD, LCD)

Ecclesiastical career
- Religion: Catholic
- Ordained: 7 October 1913

Willem Duynstee was a Dutch Catholic priest, jurist, moralist, and professor born at Sittard, the Netherlands, in 1886. After gaining a doctorate in criminal law in 1908, Willem joined the Redemptorists and was ordained a priest in 1913. In 1935, he was the first to provide a Thomist understanding of psychological repression and therapy which was fundamentally different from that of the neurologist Sigmund Freud. Duynstee was proficient in the anthropology and philosophy of Aristotle and Thomas Aquinas, whereas Freud invented his own language and explanations for what became the onset of psychoanalysis. Duynstee demonstrated philosophically how emotional repression is caused by harmful judgments that start in the internal senses. According to Duynstee, these sense judgments misdirect the irascible emotions, such as fear and anger. These in turn displace right reason and bury alive the pleasurable emotions of love, desire, and joy. Duynstee diagnosed the cause of repression as being within the internal senses, specifically erroneous harmful cogitative judgments that misguide the emotions. He went on to provide an explanation for a morally acceptable sound therapy to remediate the emotional repressive disorder. Anna Terruwe, Duynstee's protege, built on his insights and went on to call it Mortification Therapy (MT).

== Biography ==
Willem Jacobus Antonius Joseph Duynstee was born in Sittard in the Roman Catholic Diocese of Roermond on 6 September 1886. The Duynstee Family originally came from The Hague. Willem's grandfather, Jacobus Johannes Duijnstee, was a bricklayer and his grandmother was Maria Theresia Leenen. They had three boys and two girls. Willem's father Theodorus Johannes Antonius Duynstee married Adriana Wilhelmina Reuther in 1883 and together they had four girls and four boys, one of whom was Willem. Theodore after studying law became a jurist, judge, politician, and eventually was elected a member of the Dutch House of Representatives of the General States.

Willem Duynstee received his primary education at Druten and Roermond and sat for his higher citizen school entrance exam (HBS) at Roermond and Den Bosch (i.e., ‘s-Hertogenbosch). Willem completed his high school education, and in 1904 sat for his university entrance exam at the Stedelijk Gymnasium in Den Bosch, where he excelled.

Following in his father Theodore’s footsteps Duynstee studied law but went on to have an outstanding career as an academic, professor, and religious missionary. He became a conservative theologian in his Catholic teaching and practice.

== Legal studies ==
Shadowing the successful steps of his father, Duynstee commenced his reading of law at the Municipal University of Amsterdam. He achieved a degree in civil law and completed his legal studies in 1908 with a doctoral degree in criminal law. Duynstee, throughout his life, remained an active lawyer before the Bar of Dutch Jurists.

Many presumed that Duynstee would pursue a legal career, but upon completing his law degree, he immediately sought entrance into the Congregation of the Most Holy Redeemer, whose spiritual founder was the celebrated Italian lawyer from Naples, Alphonsus Maria de Liguori. Afterwards in 1920, as a religious priest, he fulfilled doctoral studies in Ecclesiastical Law, specializing in the Canon law of the Catholic Church with a second doctorate from the University of Amsterdam.

Duynstee was well-versed in the writings of Thomas Aquinas and consistently promoted and employed Aquinas’ insights in all his writings and teachings of philosophy, theology, law, and psychology.

== Religious life ==
Entering the Redemptorists at Witten, Germany, Duynstee completed his religious novitiate and publicly professed the evangelical counsels of chastity, poverty, and obedience, at 's-Hertogenbosch on May 28, 1909. After completing clerical studies, he was ordained a priest on October 7, 1913.

Duynstee's superiors planned to further his theological studies in Rome, but this plan was thwarted by the outbreak of the First World War. Nevertheless, his superiors appointed him to various apostolates and then in 1920, he was assigned to the Redemptorist Seminary at Witten.

Here, Duynstee came under the tutelage of his Redemptorist confrere, the published moral theologian Cornelius Damen (1881-1953). Duynstee cooperated with Damen during completion of the 1932 ninth revised edition of the moral text by Jozef Aertnys's (1828-1915), Theologia moralis secundum doctrinam S. Alphonsi Liguori, which was first published in 1886. Aertnys’ text originally updated Alphonsus di Liguori's (1696-1787), four volume Moral Theology: Theologia Moralis. Duynstee, among other sections, contributed the tract on Virtue to the Aertnys/Damen Four Volume Moral Manual for Priests.

Duynstee succeeded Damen as seminary professor in the disciplines of moral, ascetical, and mystical theology from 1921 to 1927. Later, he was appointed to teach moral theology to all the Redemptorist students in the Dutch Province. Duynstee was an erudite legalist and moralist of the Alphonsian tradition.

Duynstee was appointed first rector of the newly built St. Joseph's retreat house in Zenderen, Overijssel, which was established by the Dutch Province on July 27, 1927. Duynstee was also the first rector of that Redemptorist Community. One year on, Duynstee was nominated as a professor at the Catholic University of Nijmegen and was appointed to the Faculty of Law. He lectured in criminal law and procedural justice, holding all these offices concurrently.

The Redemptorist Order requires a spirit of self-sacrifice for the salvation of others. True to this spirit, Duynstee weathered the many calumnies, difficulties, contradictions, persecutions, and misunderstandings he experienced during the last three decades of his life. Apostolically, Redemptorist priests and brothers ‘are essentially a missionary society... According to their rule they are "to strive to imitate the virtues and examples of Jesus Christ, the Redeemer, consecrating themselves especially to the preaching of the word of God to the poor.”

Consecrated life in the Dutch Church was known to be arduous. In the early decades of the 20th Century, long-suffering religious orders were overly strict partly due to the rigorous tendencies of Jansenism. Catholic Devotions to the Sacred Heart of Jesus had mitigated Jansenist tendencies. . In 1965, the Vatican Council II went further by producing the document, Perfectae Caritatis releasing many religious from the remnants of Jansenism via modern adaptations to the consecrated life. Meanwhile, Redemptorist priests were formed in the distinctive Alphonsian Æquiprobabilism, moderating issues of probabilism, probabiliorism, rigorism, and laxism.

Such theological teachings prepared Duynstee for his unique and prophetic psychological insights. The condition of erring by a defective excessive control, and its opposite an excessive defectiveness are two sides of the same coin found in emotionally repressed persons. They err emotionally either by a repressive sexual anorexia, or by being out of control with the symptoms of an emotional obsessive and compulsive disorder or even sexual addiction. Virtue is in the temperate mean between excessive control and deficient moral recklessness. ‘In morals, vices are opposed to one another and to virtue in respect of excess and deficiency.’.

Duynstee had many supporters, but he also had critics. Following a dispute with other religious authorities over his teachings, he was removed from his University Chair in 1956. Later, from March 1957 to December 1960, the Vatican had Duynstee's superiors exile him to Italy. After this exile was withdrawn, he returned to the Netherlands. At that time his local superior Fr VeZen, an ex-student of Duynstee, cherished the hope of gathering several of Duynstee's best articles and publishing them in a single readily accessible text. The fruit of his labors was the book, Verspreide Opstellen (“Scattered Writings”), which marked Duynstee's fiftieth anniversary of ordination to the priesthood. With the passing of Duynstee's persecution and just after returning from Italy, PJA Calon wrote the following affirmation in the Introduction of Verspreide Opstellen, ‘Fr Duynstee never spoke at length nor were his teachings wide-ranging, but everything to which he directed his mind, he penetrated to the core and presented insights, which often opened to others entirely new perspectives.’ Van Eek said about Duynstee: ‘what he has written has lasting value.’

== Priestly accomplishments ==
As a consecrated religious and priest, Duynstee was devoted to the Redemptorist's apostolic mission. Duynstee was adept in focusing his clerical ministry to the service of others in varying ways, including lecturing, providing parish missions, and retreat work, as well as being a spiritual director and confessor to many on the Nijmegen University campus. He was especially active in fostering and nurturing young laity, priestly vocations, seminarians, and helping fellow priests. At Witten, Duynstee gave spiritual direction and guidance to the students as the prefect of seminarians. Indeed, the pastoral care of clerical students was of particular interest to him his entire life.

By 1927, Duynstee was approached by the Catholic University of Nijmegen (i.e., now Radmond University) to establish and chair a new faculty for criminal law and procedural justice. However, Duynstee was denied permission by his superiors for this prestigious post at that time. Afterwards in 1928, he was appointed to the University of Nijmegen to teach criminal law and criminal procedure. Duynstee was appointed university Rector for the Nijmegen University academic year of 1940/1941 by the Board of the St. Radboud Foundation. He was honorably discharged from this post under the rule of the German Occupiers who forbade clerics from the performance of such duties. However, he remained on his professorial chair of the Faculty of Law until his enforced retirement in 1956, when he was told to resign due to the controversy concerning his support of Mortification Therapy, an initiative of Anna Terruwe, Duynstee's colleague.

=== Published writings ===
Duynstee penned many articles on matters related to law and religion. In 1919, he published ‘‘Civil Law and Counselling’’, a manual that was reprinted eight times as well as ‘‘The Traditional Doctrine of Chastity’’. In 1939, he published his ‘‘Introduction to Law’’, while 1940 saw him release the ‘‘History of Natural Law’’ and ‘‘The Philosophy of Law’’ in the Netherlands. In 1948, he added to these volumes the text ‘‘Legal Philosophy’’. In his book ‘‘On Law and Justice’’, published in 1956, Duynstee elaborated on his Thomist view of legal philosophy. Diverse articles of his ideas in printed form were gathered together in his final publication,Verspreide Opstellen.

Duynstee held numerous editorial positions and a place on the Nijmegen University Board. In addition to his writings on legal and theological subjects, he frequently contributed to scholarly periodicals. He was editor of the magazine Studio Catholica. He edited or collaborated with magazines such as Dutch Catholic Voices, Criminal Psychology Monthly, Penal Reform, Noble Men and Women, and others.

Foundations

Duynstee was one of the founders of the Society of Philosophy in 1933. In his scientific publications, Duynstee consistently emphasized the intersection of jurisprudence, theology, and philosophy. He included a particular emphasis on Thomism and especially the doctrine on natural law.

Duynstee was a member of the Netherlands' State Constitutional Committee of 1921 and legal counsel for the Dutch Episcopate.

== Medicine, psychology, philosophy, psychiatric therapy, and moral theology ==
=== Medicine ===
In addition to his professorship, Duynstee was active in the social and medical field. He was one of the founders of the Dutch Institute of Psychology. He was the chairman for two psychological foundations from 1936 to 1949, namely St. Joseph's and St. Maarten's Clinic in Nijmegen. He also was a member and twice the chairperson of the board of regents for Nijmegen's St Canisius Hospital.

=== Contribution to psychology ===
In the 1930s, Duynstee originated a significant understanding of emotional sexual repression, different from the behavioral/ psychological models of Freudian Psychoanalysis. Once familiar with Sigmund Freud's concept of pathological repression, Duynstee reviewed this novel insight through a philosophical lens. He applied his understandings via his pastoral experience with penitents and seminarians struggling with chastity, pornography, scrupulosity, and recidivist acts of obsessive and compulsive repression. By applying philosophical principles from Aristotle and Aquinas’ anthropology, Duynstee articulated an explanation for repression differing from that of Freud.

With the help of his education, formation, and pastoral experience, Duynstee applied philosophical principles to the concept of vice and was able to create a comprehensive and reasonable explanation and understanding for pathological emotional repression. Duynstee's elucidation was not novel. He merely spelt out for modern times a longstanding explanation from the philosophy of Aquinas, which traces its lineage all the way back to Aristotle. Aquinas argued, and therefore Duynstee, that the rational appetite of the will is free to choose and to love but only insofar as the faculty of the intellect is appropriately formed, can deliberate, forming and reforming judgments, and direct the will. Human dignity entails the ability to initiate and control one's actions. For Duynstee, persons who suffer an emotional repressive disorder lack freedom of choice (i.e., liberum arbitrium). A therapy must aim at restoring personal freedom, psychological and moral.

Aquinas, in his thirteenth-century treatment of both natural and moral vice asks the question, “What are the causes of sin? Are they internal or external, or because one sin leads to another?” In the case of repression, Duynstee focused on Aquinas’ explanation as to the cause of sin on the part of the sensitive appetite (i.e., the human operative power, whereby people are moved to respond and to react to particular objects perceived by the senses). In these few articles from Aquinas can be found the philosophical principles underlying emotional repression, specifically, how the intellect and will can independently be affected by the lower internal senses and why this happens. The questions are: ‘Whether the will is moved by a passion of the sensitive appetite?’ And, ‘Whether the reason can be overcome by a passion, against its knowledge?’

Duynstee's clarification of the philosophical cause for pathological repression was presented to the Association of Thomistic Philosophy, of which he was a co-founder. His lecture was entitled, ‘‘De Verdringingstheorie, Beoordeeld Van Thomistisch Standpunt’’ (i.e., The Displacement Theory Judged from a Thomistic Perspective).

Duynstee had realized that ethical rules and moral norms, when wrongly interpreted in practice by many in the name of religion among the Christian population, were an important factor in the development of emotional and mental disorders. By the late 1920s, he was looking for solutions to the Freudian theory of repression, where repression was caused by what Freud entitled the superego. Duynstee wanted a less rigorist interpretation of rules, laws, and commandments, whereby more people were better able to interpret such precepts reasonably and apply them virtuously. He established contacts in psycho-medical circles, where he raised and discussed this problem.

=== Philosophy ===
According to Duynstee, human persons are innately sensual. Their feelings and emotions are by nature under the control of reason and will. But feelings, also by nature, primarily follow sensual experiences, even before the intellect and the will can begin to exercise their controlling influence. As soon as the sensible object is present, feelings spontaneously arise in response. Reason’s governance, however, is not of the order that the emotions entirely obey it. This theory draws on the philosophy, which teaches that ‘reason governs not by a “despotic supremacy,” ...but by a “politic and royal supremacy” whereby “the free are governed, who are not wholly subject to reason’s command.”‘

A significant aspect of MT is to provide the afflicted person with an understanding of their psychological powers as provided by philosophical psychology. This information is both informative and liberating. It is the philosophy and psychology of the human psyche. By knowing and understanding this schema the important terms are grasped and clarity is found concerning the human powers and their names relating to MT.

The internal sense of the cogitative power (i.e., estimative sense or particular reason) has a prior governing role to that of intellectual reason. It is the internal senses of cogitative power, along with the memory and imagination that produce the phantasm through which the agent intellect informs the possible intellect (i.e., universal reason). It is these interior sense judgments that can be distorted early in life, or through sexual trauma. These judgments can have an adverse effect on the intellectual or cognitive faculties. But it is only when the refusal of a pleasurable good is not based on reasonable motives, but on feelings, that it can become a repression. In that case one emotion (i.e., fear) attempts to unreasonably force another emotion away (i.e., desire), and this is unnatural.

By way of example, a child dislikes the taste of Brussels sprouts. After judging them bitter, the child refuses to eat them. That sense judgment will remain throughout life unless a different intellectual judgment replaces it. Brussels sprouts are nutritionally excellent vegetables, so a properly informed person might choose to eat them regardless of their taste. This is a reasonable act.

But in the case of sexual abuse, the problem is more serious and complicated. A child before the age of reason can experience the appropriate sense knowledge of sexual arousal as abuse. And in this case, the bodily powers simultaneously communicate mixed messages to the interior senses such as pleasure and pain, care and confusion, desire and aversion, love and hate, memories of fear that become profoundly ingrained, despair and sadness, vulnerability, and anger. The complexity of harmful judgments is formed and memorized. These recollections, whether known or repressed, continue to reappear involuntarily, and play on the imagination, and the cogitative power judgments. Hence, the cognitive awareness and intellectual arguments later in life cannot adequately modify the erroneous cogitative sense judgments that are now connatural to the abuse survivor. As experience demonstrates, past abuse and volitional and intellectually determined repressive disorders are firmly embedded. “In the case of a conflict between the emotions of the two appetites - desire and fear - the sensory life does not possess any natural means of solution...both emotions continue their active inclinations.” MT, as psychotherapy, provides an explanation and solution to this learnt and pathological habituated repressive disorder.

=== Psychiatry – Anna Terruwe collaborates with Duynstee ===
Duynstee met Anna Terruwe in the mid-1930s when she was a young medical student. After WWII, Terruwe would go on to become the first woman psychiatrist in the Netherlands. Terruwe sought to bring about a reconciliation between Catholic doctrines on faith and morals and the repression theories of Sigmund Freud. She had sought a scientific bridge between psychiatric studies and Catholic doctrine. Freud's (atheistic) theories of psychological repression had led him to reject religious and objective moral norms. Freud had viewed customs, mores, and religious precepts as a contributing influence and cause of pathological repression. Following Duynstee's lead, Terruwe demonstrated from psychiatry that it was not the Freudian concept of the superego that was responsible for pathological repression. Rather, “the repressive conflict takes place among the emotions themselves, and not between an emotion and a superego force.”

A cogitative internal sense judgment can influence both the intellectual and sensitive appetites. Conflicts can develop in two possible ways; between the sensory appetites and the will, or within the sensory appetite itself. That is, an object can be pleasing to one appetite (i.e., sensitive appetite, the emotions) and at the same time harmful for another (i.e., rational appetite, the will), which simultaneously moves toward and away from the same object. Or a conflict occurs when two opposing emotions (e.g., fear opposes desire) are present simultaneously in regard to one and the same object. For example, a person may experience a sexual desire (i.e., concupiscible powers) and the same time be afraid (i.e., assertive powers) of the object of that desire or the desire itself. Or the reverse may happen. Something is experienced as unpleasant by one sense appetite but is pursued as useful by the other sense appetite. Hence, it was not Freud's super-ego of customs, religious, and objective moral norms, but the cogitative sense power (i.e., particular reason) that stimulated what Terruwe called usefulness or harmfulness sense judgments towards a particular object.

Duynstee supported Terruwe's psychiatric activities, helping develop and further her understanding of the displacement of reason and will as taught by Aquinas. Terruwe had been a student of Aquinas’ philosophy and theology at university. She was excited by this novel understanding so different from the popular, but enigmatic, theoretical Freudian explanation and therapeutic psychoanalysis. With Duynstee's assistance, Terruwe chose to complete her doctoral dissertation on neuroses (i.e., emotional disorders) from the perspective of the Christian anthropological and psychological foundations of Thomistic philosophy and theology. The doctoral dissertation was entitled, De Neurose in het Licht van der Rationale Psychologie (i.e., Neurosis in the Light of Rational Psychology).

Based on Duynstee's insights and pastoral practice, Terruwe in her doctoral dissertation of 1949 defined a new understanding of the repressive neurosis (i.e., emotional repressive disorder). Although the specifics of the therapy were not included in the doctoral dissertation, Terruwe and Duynstee had used it successfully with many of their clients and penitents.

Moreover, outside of, and over above Freudian teachings, Terruwe categorized and classified an entirely previously undiscovered and undiagnosed emotional disorder, the Frustration Neurosis (i.e., Emotional Deprivation Disorder). Again, she not only provided the diagnosis but also an appropriate prognosis based on Affirmation Therapy. In a moral-theological and philosophical sense, Terruwe (developing the comprehensions of Duynstee) provided psychiatry with psychotherapeutic approaches for the healing of two very different emotional disorders, that is, mortification therapy for the repressive disorder, and affirmation therapy for the emotionally deprived. Terruwe's clinical prescription and practice were both inspired and endorsed by Duynstee, who earlier referred to the roots of both emotional disorders in his original work, ‘‘The Displacement Theory Judged from the Thomistic Perspective’’.

=== Psychiatric therapy ===
In Christian Theology, mortification refers to bringing “to death” something humanly unruly or seemingly-uncontrollable, especially one's concupiscible or pleasurable powers (i.e., food, sex, play, rest, etc.). Theology views the flesh as wounded and in need of reasonable governance and appropriate vigilance. The flesh needs to be governed or mortified, which literally means “put to death”, but not annihilated or repressed. MT states that though this is difficult for all, it is not impossible with the assistance of God's helping grace. This idea has its roots in the teachings of the apostle Paul, who saw mortification as a key ingredient to a peaceful and happy life. Mortification therapy draws a distinction between the mortification of the deeds of the flesh, and its powers. For example, it's okay to be angry, but don't punch your enemy. It's okay to be attracted to another person's spouse, but don't seduce them. Mortify a nasty deed, not the human potential built into both body and soul as a human gift.

Hence, psychologically, mortification therapy is about putting to death an emotional disorder or pathology that afflicts the body and soul, not the body or soul's powers. Stated more positively, MT returns to the afflicted person the possibility of freely choosing how to act with right reason and not be pushed and pulled by obsessions and compulsions. Mortification returns personal freedom, and therefore, the possibility of growing in virtue.

Duynstee's contribution to Mortification Therapy, or “MT” for short, was conceived from the philosophical and psychological perspectives that return fearfully afflicted and sexually repressed persons to a newfound liberty for life. It is akin to a remediation analogous with ‘the same developmental path as a child walks.’ Such liberty is a ‘‘freedom for morality’’ and for a personal “freedom for excellence”. MT liberates sexually afflicted persons from what are often inveterate materially sinful habits. In brief, among other essential elements, MT has three different roles to play. It helps the afflicted person (1) to mortify the repressing emotion(s). (2) To inform the cognitive faculties via information, catechesis, and formation aimed at restoring the displacement of right reason and the will. And (3) to permit the reemergence of the repressed pleasure appetite buried alive by the repressing pathology.

MT addresses a repressive pathology as a disturbance within the body and soul. According to Terruwe, an emotional repressive disorder is a dis-ease something like a malignant tumor afflicting the body. The cells of the body are no longer doing what they were designed to do. Repression occurs when the emotions are no longer under the free direction of the person. Rather the person suffers from their unruliness. The emotional life, and its misdeeds, are no longer under the control of the person's spiritual faculties of intellect and will. Simply, it means that the car is out of control because the driver is unconscious to other forces controlling him or her.

For Duynstee, that means an emotionally repressed person may DESIRE and want something, but the person FEARS what they WANT, and attempts to avoid or BLOCK what is WANTED from their consciousness. But this is done before getting prior reasonable guidance from their intellect. What has happened is that rather than getting rational guidance, the lesser internal cogitative sense power habitually directs the emotions accordingly, but wrongly. For example, the sexually abused girl has not only been sexually abused but also psychologically interfered with and thereby damaged within the internal senses and the sensitive appetite. Abuse survivors truly know this torment, pain, lack of freedom and inhibiting mystery. They feel it intimately in their body as an involuntary impulse of fear or some other bodily change. It is discomforting, always unwilled, and spontaneous. Later, the girl marries but is never comfortable with her husband in their marital relations because the earlier internal judgment has been warped, misdirected, and distorted by the childhood abuse. In this case, the afflicted survivor needs to relearn how to connaturally accept, understand, and be capable of fully enjoying her procreative powers with delight. The goal of MT is to aid with this remediation.

Duynstee understood that the pre-existing inner emotional turmoil fixed in memory, sensations, and feelings (i.e., fears, aversion, hatred, sadness, anger, etc.) is what needs to be mortified and corrected, and not the emotions themselves. Over time the recovering person, learns how to permit a free flow of sensations, feelings, emotions, imaginings, and thoughts, thus restoring reasonable governance of their person. In this way, afflicted persons gradually obtain liberation from habitually unnatural and involuntary emotional subjugation by the cogitative sense power, and to restore to the intellectual faculties’ their proper governance of the sensitive appetite.

=== Moral theology ===
Duynstee's chief argument in defense of his doctrine was based on the nature of the freedom of the will as presented in Aquinas’ Summa Theologiae. A person must have clear knowledge and be authentically free if they are to be capable and culpable of grave vice and serious sin. If, however, right reason be displaced through a psychopathology then such persons suffering from an emotional repressive disorder have diminished responsibility. Duynstee argued from Aquinas that both reason and will can be, and are, displaced in the repressed person. This displacement of reason and will radically diminishes moral capacity and culpability. The daily experience of sexual abuse survivors, intellectually and volitionally determined repressed persons, and fearfully obsessive-compulsive repressive scrupulants demonstrates that such persons are not completely free and responsible for their actions in the specific area of their unique repression.

This fact is a result of their chronic and serious sensate distortions arising from their malformed cogitative power and cognitive faculties evolving from whatever source. Citing Aquinas, Duynstee demonstrated that there can be a serious and inveterate natural vice that impacts human acts and their moral responsibility. While sexual molestation and abuse are criminal acts against an innocent human being, the perpetrator can be suffering from a grave obsessive-compulsive repressive disorder. Duynstee as a criminal lawyer was acutely aware of crimes against innocents and was deeply solicitous for their wellbeing as an educator, and even more concerned for their victims. Hence, the need for the education and remediation of emotional repressive disorders that are an engrained, persistent, and deleterious condition for both potential perpetrators and their victims. Moreover, such a repressive condition altogether frustrates the development of virtue, and negatively impinges on potential spiritual formation and growth in human life for afflicted individuals.

In Duynstee's view, an emotional repressive disorder is a psychopathology. One act of repression is sufficient to begin a deep-rooted and debilitating habit. For example, one frightful act of molestation is sufficient to begin an emotional repressive disorder. A solitary willful decision can initiate a lifelong intellectually or volitionally determined energy-based emotional disorder, with recurring obsessive-compulsive repressive effects. As Aquinas wrote, ‘Bodily habits can be caused by one act if the active principle is of great power.’ The internal senses are a unified force consisting of the cogitative power (i.e., particular reason), common sense, memory, and imagination, and these internal senses are capable of misleading not only the cognitive faculty (i.e., intellect or universal reason), but also of exerting primary power over the appetites (i.e., the will) and the sensitive appetite, wherein repression occurs.

PJ A Calon writing in 1963 about Duynstee's philosophical insight and psychological discernment stated that "His introduction to repression, considered from a Thomist point of view, as presented to the Association of Thomistic Philosophy (of which he was one of the founders), formulated for the first time a Catholic perspective of Freud's teaching on repression. This teaching is both understandable and completely acceptable. He thereby prepared the way for the development of a whole new explanation of emotional disorders and therapeutic techniques (i.e., "neurosenleer en neurosentherapie")."

== Controversy ==
=== Repression and morality ===
In a recovering post-war Netherlands of 1949, conservative Catholic clerics applying a voluntarist philosophical approach to human psychology accused Duynstee of being a Freudian devotee. It was claimed that he had deviated from Catholic doctrine and deserved canonical censure. These accusations went so far as to accuse him of inciting masturbation and voyeurism in his penitents and encouraging his student Terruwe to do the same for her psychiatric patients.

Duynstee was investigated by a board of seminary professors in 1949, who were assembled to assess and judge his teaching. The Dutch Episcopacy gathered this team of seminary rectors and moralists to cross-examine both Duynstee and Terruwe about their doctrines. This enquiry was headed by Cardinal Johannes de Jong. After the exhaustive interrogation, the opinion of the appointed committee, which included moral theologians from various Dutch seminaries, found nothing untoward. The examiners declared that they recognized that Duynstee/Terruwe's understanding of the emotional repressive disorder, and its prescribed Mortification Therapy, were ‘orthodox in teaching and prudent in practice.’ Moreover, MT maintains established norms for Christian sexual continence, chastity, and celibacy. Indeed, the therapy remediates impediments to the development of the virtue of temperance, and therefore chastity, within sexually afflicted persons.

=== A Vatican investigation ===
During 1954–1955, an official ‘apostolic visitator’ was sent to the Netherlands to further investigate the controversy surrounding Duynstee and Terruwe. This visitation was made on behalf of the Vatican's Holy Office (Congregation for the Doctrine of the Faith) which had followed Duynstee and Terruwe with suspicion because of concerns raised by the Inter-Nuncio Archbishop Paolo Giobbe. The Pontifical investigator was Sebastiaan Tromp, who was a consulter for the Holy Office. Despite the decision of the 1949 board of examiners, Tromp sided with his Jesuit confreres at the University of Nijmegen and against Duynstee. Inexplicably, although the Vatican Visitator questioned several theologians from the university ‘pressuring them for information’, Duynstee and Terruwe were ignored by Tromp, as were Professors Prick and Calon, from the disciplines of psychiatry and medical psychology, respectively. Moreover, Tromp did not inquire of Buytendijk, who was chairman of the Central Catholic Association for Mental Health (KCV) in the Netherlands. Tromp, however, did speak to F J Theo Rutten (professor of psychology at Nijmegen and a politician, and who at the time was the Dutch Minister of Education and famous for banning comics in the Netherlands). Rutten also sided with Ellerbeck and other voluntarist theologians.

As a result of Tromp's inquiries, in 1956 Duynstee was peremptorily and compulsorily ‘retired’ from his University Chair at Radboud in the Diocese of Roermond, a position he had held for many years. His fellow professors and priest friends tried to fight this dismissal, to no avail. He was exiled from the Netherlands in 1957 to a small Redemptorist community in Italy until 1963 and forbidden, again under the religious vow of obedience, to have any contact with Terruwe.

A further consequence of Tromp's investigation of the teachings and practices of Duynstee and Terruwe was a Roman Curial response in 1956 by way of a letter to the Dutch Episcopacy. This canonical communiqué was entitled ‘‘Quaedam admonitiones theoriam et praxim curationis spectantes psychoneurosi laborantium” [Some warnings regarding the theory and practice for the treatment of psychoneuroses]’’. While the communique did not mention Duynstee or Terruwe by name, it was an implied warning to Bishops about modern, ‘pernicious’ and novel psychological theories, and a prohibition against allowing priests, religious, seminarians, and novices to receive psychological advice from women psychiatrists (with Terruwe being the only woman psychiatrist in Holland at the time). This admonition was repeated in 1957 and 1958. It was most injurious to Terruwe's personal reputation and professional practice, and by implication to Duynstee.

Even after Duynstee's return to the Netherlands, he was forbidden to contact Terruwe. Duynstee was eventually vindicated from all alleged error in 1965. But this only happened as a result of a specific inquiry into the ‘Terruwe Affair’. Henricus Ruygers, under the authority of Cardinal Bernard Alfrink, conducted a thorough investigation over nearly a year's duration. Once all the findings were documented, Cardinal Alfrink, supported by the Bishops' Conference of the Netherlands, arranged a special intervention in Rome for a papal audience with Pope Paul VI.

Carlo Leget in his article Moral Theology Upside Down, wrote “Duynstee paved the way for integrating Freud’s insights in Thomistic psychology. Duynstee’s ideas were worked out by psychiatrist A.A.A. Terruwe... Although the ideas of Duynstee and Terruwe caused enormous upheaval in the 1950s and 1960s, the fuss was more due to socio-psychological and church political causes than to a misunderstanding of Aquinas and Freud. In fact, their interpretation of Aquinas is both very fruitful and based on the text of Aquinas instead of on later Thomistic traditions.”

=== Vindication ===
Duynstee was fully and publicly vindicated through Alfrink's mediation. Terruwe was publicly exonerated. This was a major moment in the controversy that made front-page news in the Netherlands and later in Rome in its daily Vatican news. Pope Paul VI, apologized on behalf of the Catholic Church to Terruwe (Duynstee having already died) for the mistreatment and the suffering they experienced.

=== Final years ===
Duynstee died in France at Menton, travelling to Rome with Terruwe to show his adherence to the doctrine of Pope Paul VI and his encyclical Humanae vitae. According to the only general and national Biographical Dictionary in the Netherlands (BWN), which is both an authoritative and scientific reference work published by Huygens ING of Amsterdam, JP de Valk relates that Duynstee was recognised for his distinguished service to the Catholic Church, not only for his 60 years as a Redemptorist religious and for over 55 years as a priest, missionary, and legal professor but also for the wrongful censure and disparagement he endured because of his insights into modern philosophical psychology and psychiatry. Duynstee died on November 8, 1968, aged 82. A modest memorial obituary included on page two was published in the Vatican's daily newspaper, L’Osservatore Romano on November 14, 1968. This memorial article was in part linked to a pre-existing plan by the Vatican to offer a sign of posthumous restitution for the ill repute that Willem Duynstee suffered during his life. It was Anna Terruwe's "firm conviction [that it] was connected with the existing intention in Rome to offer Duynstee a cardinal appointment as a sign of reparation."

== Writings ==
- Civil Law and Counselling (1919). It was reprinted eight times during his life.
- The Traditional Doctrine of Chastity (1919). Reprinted the fourth time in 1932.
- ‘Legal Sterilization of the Mentally Retarded’ (1930).
- ‘The Cause of Crime among Catholics’ (1933).
- ‘The German Sterilization Law’ (1933).
- ‘Lex Van der Lubbe, the Retroactive Death Penalty for Arson’ (1933).
- 'Displacement Theory Judged from a Thomistic Perspective' (1935)
- Introduction to Law (1939).
- History of Natural Law (1940).
- Philosophy of Law in the Netherlands (1940).
- Legal Philosophy (1948).
- On law and Justice (1956).
- Scattered Writings [an Anthology, Verspreide Opstellen] (1963).
