= NanoLab Nijmegen =

Dutch research laboratory

Coordinates: 51.8228°N 5.8707°E

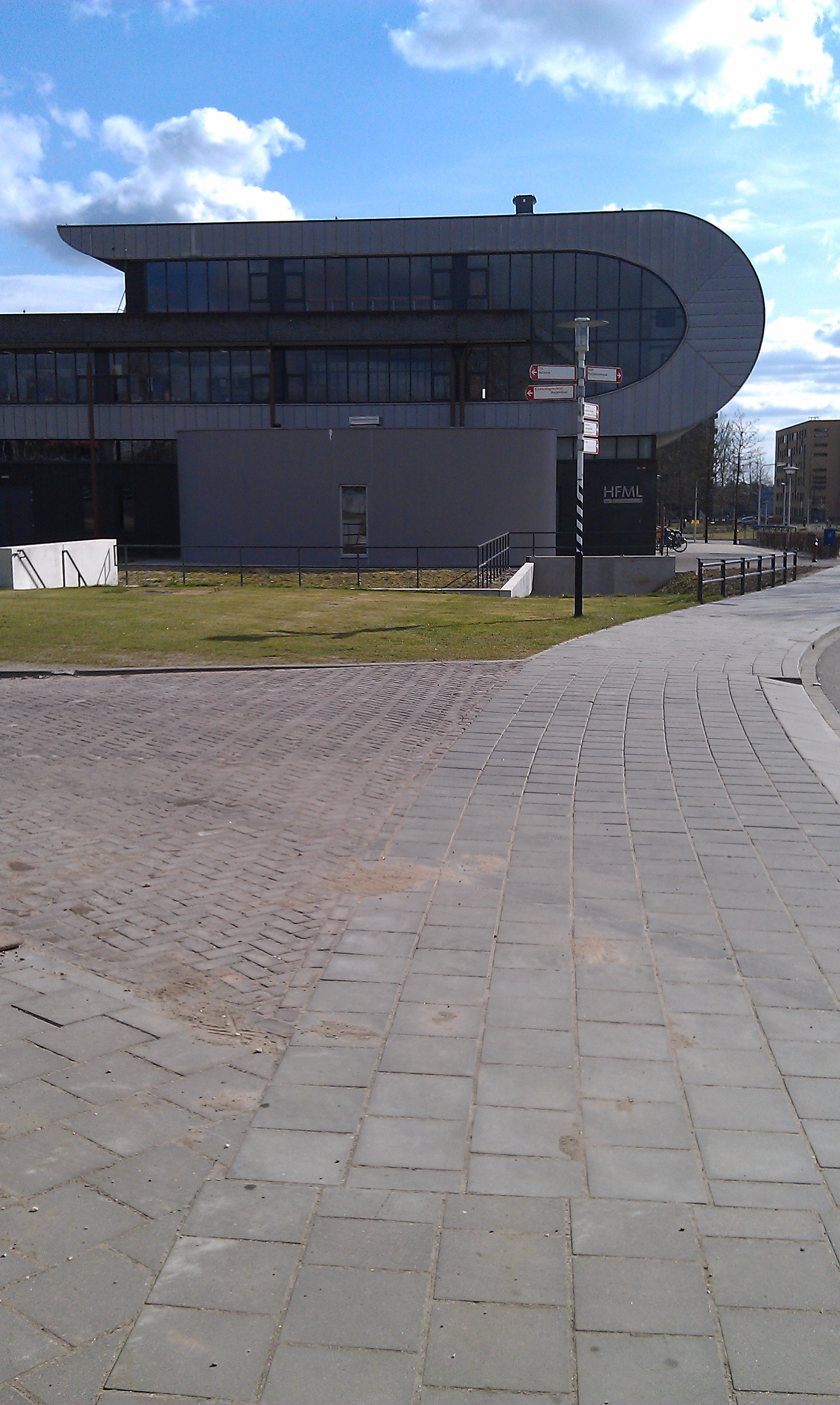
The NanoLab Nijmegen

NanoLab Nijmegen is a laboratory at Radboud University Nijmegen in the Netherlands.

Its goal is to contribute to knowledge transfer between academia and industry to make new developments in nanoscience and technology accessible for enterprises. It is done mainly via research jobs and collaborative research projects with industry, workshops, and training. Many projects employ scanning probe microscopy methods as the primary experimental approach.

The initiative is broadly based in the Institute for Molecules and Materials, next to the Scanning Tunneling Microscopy group. The groups Spectroscopy of Solids and Interfaces, Solid State Chemistry, Condensed Matter Science, Supramolecular Chemistry, and Molecular Materials are participating.

NanoLab Nijmegen has received funding from Europees Fonds for Regionale Ontwikkeling (EFRO) and NanoNed, a.o. The new NanoLab building was officially opened in March 2006 by the Queen's commissioner Clemens Cornielje.

== See also ==
- Radboud University Nijmegen
