= Algemeen Nijmeegs Studentenblad =

The Algemeen Nijmeegs Studentenblad is an independent student magazine for the Radboud University Nijmegen. Founded in 1985 by members of the local student union AKKU, it is now published by the Stichting Multimedia.

== Notable publications and controversies ==
In 1989 ANS started to publish the monthly comic strip DirkJan, before it moved to SjoSji. The magazine has published controversial articles that attracted nation-wide media attention, such as on the benefits of marihuana consumption for studying. In 2010 the university refused to distribute the magazine among freshmen because it did not endorse the editorial.
