= Hans de Kroon =

Dutch ecologist

Hans de Kroon is a Dutch ecologist specializing in plant and insect life who works at Radboud University, where he chairs the Experimental Plant Ecology group. He is known for a 2007 study that concluded that in Germany "the abundance of flying insects has plunged by three-quarters over the past 25 years".

== Future Dikes ==
De Kroon has applied his research to practical purposes, particularly to the extended system of dikes in the Netherlands. In 2022 he argued that the 17,000 kilometers of dikes in the country offered a great opportunity to provide a habitat of wildflowers and grasses for insects. By 2023 he was leading the "Future Dikes" group from Radboud University, which established how flood-resistant a dike reinforced by flowers, grass, and herbs was. The group noted that the great variety of dikes and environments called for different plants in different areas; for instance, they found that only 25 types of plants were appropriate for the heavy clay dikes (grazed by sheep) along the Wadden Sea, but a test dike in Gelderland had over sixty kinds, and others might have up to two hundred.

In June 2024 the group published its report, concluding that the new standard for dike management should be that they be planted with lots of flowers, which strengthen the dikes against increasing summer drought and annual floods. Such dikes also offer an opportunity for insects, and their management would require less time and money in mowing.

In 2024 he was appointed to the board of Utrechts Landschap, one of the 12 provincial landscape foundations in the Netherlands.

== Notable publications ==
- Hallmann, Caspar A.; Sorg, Martin; Jongejans, Eelke; Siepel, Henk; Hofland, Nick; Schwan, Heinz; Stenmans, Werner; Müller, Andreas; Sumser, Hubert; Hörren, Thomas; Goulson, Dave; De Kroon, Hans (18 October 2017). "More than 75 percent decline over 27 years in total flying insect biomass in protected areas". PLOS One. 12 (10) e0185809. Bibcode:2017PLoSO..1285809H. doi:10.1371/journal.pone.0185809. PMC 5646769. PMID 29045418.
