= Anna Terruwe =

Dutch Catholic psychiatrist (1911–2004)

- Born: Anna Alberdina Antoinette Terruwe; 19 August 1911; Vierlingsbeek, Netherlands
- Died: 28 April 2004 (aged 92); Deurne, Netherlands
- Medical career
- Field: Psychiatry
- Sub-specialties: Mental disorders

Anna Alberdina Antoinette Terruwe (19 August 1911 – 28 April 2004) was a Dutch Catholic psychiatrist. She discovered emotional deprivation disorder and how obsessive–compulsive disorder could be healed: the "bevestigingsleer," the idea of "affirmation".

Terruwe based her work on that of Thomas Aquinas and "the relevance of Thomistic rational psychology to neurosis and its treatment." Her work is also based on that of Willem Duynstee who studied Aquinas. Her theories are based on Aquinas's understanding of what he calls the "nature of man".

== Church ban ==
Terruwe made church history in the fifties. After complaints of some Jesuits a high ranking Dutch Jesuit (Sebestian Tromp) of the Holy Office issued a ban: it was forbidden for priest students to see "female psychiatrists" (there was only one: Terruwe). At the time there were still many priest students and quite a few religious superiors sent some of them to see Terruwe for their emotional distractions. Rome also ordered Terruwe's protector Prof. Willem Duynstee to come to Rome in exile.

Within ten years the Vatican had to admit that a terrible error of judgment was made. Prof. Duynstee's ban was lifted and it was said that he would have become a cardinal if his sudden death had not prevented it. Terruwe was not only rehabilitated, Pope Paul VI also consulted her several times. He called her work "a gift to the Church." She and her colleague, Conrad Baars (see below) were asked to be consultants to the 1970 Synod of Bishops regarding emotional repression and love-deprivation in priests and religious. During the Synod, they met privately for two hours with the future Pope John Paul II. Terruwe suffered a great deal but her solidarity with her Church remained firm. People considered her to be one of the 'spiritual liberators' of Dutch Catholicism. She herself did not yield to progressive Catholics who wanted her to take their side. She remained a solid advocate of celibacy for priests of the Latin rite and of a no to artificial birth control.

== United States ==
The ideas about the nature of man and his emotional life are discussed in depth in the first chapter of "Psychic Wholeness and Healing" by her and Conrad Baars, M.D., who took Terruwe's ideas and treatment to the United States. Baars came across Terruwe at a time when he was ready to abandon his practice and the field out of his frustration with the Freudian approach that emotional repression belongs to the "superego", particularly man's conscience, and the unethical treatment plan that focuses on changing a man's conscience. Terruwe practiced what she learned from Father Duynstee--that emotional repression does not belong to man's conscience, but is a conflict in the emotions themselves. It is not what a man believes about his emotions that makes him repress, but what he feels.

Terruwe embraced the spiritual aspect of the human person in the treatment of her patients. Her ideas included topics about man's emotional life, his intellect and free will, how "love is the passion of the intellect," and how the "nature" of man's emotional life is to "follow reason." The discussion continues into topics of affirmation and what it means to be "authentically human."

Baars discovered her work and went on to translate some of her work into English and further the work on "Emotional Deprivation Disorder" and the repressive disorders. She discovered "Frustration Neurosis" in the 1950s (also known as "Deprivation Neurosis", but now called Emotional Deprivation Disorder). She also discovered that repressive disorders (e.g. Obsessive Compulsive Disorder or Scrupulosity) could be healed by teaching patients a correct understanding of the emotional life.

== Last years ==
Terruwe was active in her profession till very late in her eighties. There have always been a circle of friend and admirers around her. Shortly after her death in 2004 they edited a book Bevestiging - erfdeel en opdracht. De University of Nijmegen issued recently an Anna Terruwe Award for an outstanding paper in this field.

== Bibliography ==
- The Abode of Love. St. Meinrad, IN: Abbey Press, 1970.
- Affectiviteit – effectiviteit : breekpunt van menselijk leven: over waarde-overdracht in het onderwijs. Lochem: De Tijdstroom, 1988.
- De frustratie neurose. Amsterdam: Anthos, 1998.
- De liefde bouwt een woning. Bussum: Romen, 1978.
- De toename van agressie, suïcide en druggebruik binnen de consumptiemaatschappij. Lochem - Gent: De Tijdstroom, 1986.
- Emotional Growth in Marriage. Glen Rock, NJ: Paulist Press, 1968.
- Geloven zonder angst en vrees. Roermond: J.J. Romen, 1969.
- Give Me Your Hand. Trans. Martin Van Buuren. Croydon, Victoria: Spectrum Publications, 1973.
- The Neurosis in the Light of Rational Psychology. Trans. by Conrad W. Baars. New York: P.J. Kenedy & Sons, 1960.
- Opening van zaken. In Usum privatum. Nymegen, 1964.
- Ouders en kinderen op weg naar de toekomst. Lochem: De Tijdstroom, 1976.
- Psychopathic Personality and Neurosis. Trans. Conrad W. Baars. New York: P.J. Kenedy & Sons, 1958.
- and Baars, Conrad W. Loving and Curing the Neurotic: A New Look at Emotional Illness. New Rochelle, NY: Arlington House, 1972.
- and Baars, Conrad W. Psychic Wholeness and Healing. Staten Island, NY: Alba House, 1981.
- and Kroft, A.L. De stap over de drempel: moderne visies op hulpverlening bij menswording van mentaal gehandicapte mensen. Baarn: Arbor, 1993.
- and Van Cranenburgh, H.P.Hooglied van de nieuwe liefde: antropologie van de weerhoudende liefde. Baarn: Gooi en Sticht, 1996.
