= Conrad Baars =

Dutch-American physician (1919–1981)

Conrad W. "Koert" Baars (January 2, 1919 – October 18, 1981) was a Dutch-American Catholic psychiatrist. His most prominent work is with Anna Terruwe in the study of the human emotional life. Their general idea is that many emotional disturbances in a human stem from a lack of experiencing unconditional love during his or her life. He and Terruwe are known for their model of emotional deprivation disorder and a different approach to obsessive–compulsive disorder (OCD).

Baars and Terruwe treated many priests and religious in their practices and presented important information to the bishops of the Catholic Church. The Role of the Church in the Causation, Treatment and Prevention of the Crisis in the Priesthood, was copyrighted and published by Franciscan Herald Press (Chicago, Illinois) in 1972 as part of their "Synthesis Series" as 'How to treat and prevent The Crisis in the Priesthood'. Baars wrote numerous other articles and monographs.

== Biography ==
Conrad W. "Koert" Baars was born in Rotterdam, Netherlands, on January 2, 1919. He was the second of six children.

He began his studies in chemical engineering at the University of Amsterdam. Later, he decided to study medicine. During World War II, the Nazis bombed Rotterdam. The Dutch could no longer be neutral in the war; Baars was forced to flee the country. He joined the French Resistance. During an organized escape to Spain over the Pyrenees mountains, his group got lost in a sudden snowstorm. Later, they were captured by the Nazis.

After being questioned by the Gestapo, Baars was sent to a concentration camp north of Paris. In the winter of 1943, he was transferred to the Buchenwald concentration camp. Because he was a medical student, he was put in charge of nursing the sick. Despite having better living conditions because of his position, he lost several teeth and suffered from a weakened heart due to malnutrition. He was freed on April 11, 1945, the day the American army arrived.

In 1946, Baars came to the United States on a student visa. He was an intern at a hospital in Mount Vernon, New York. Later, he moved to Chicago, Illinois, to complete a residency program. There, he met his wife, Mary Jean Kennedy. Because of their marriage, Baars was able to apply for American citizenship, which was granted on January 15, 1951.

After his marriage, Baars went into a residency program for psychiatry at the Minneapolis General Hospital in Minnesota. He grew disillusioned with the contemporary practice of psychotherapy (psychoanalysis) and considered leaving the profession. But, he encountered the works of Anna Terruwe. He was impressed by her practice of integrating psychology with spirituality. Eventually, he and Terruwe collaborated. They developed a model of practicing psychiatry based on the medieval theologian Thomas Aquinas.

Conrad Baars held a private practice in San Antonio, Texas. He also wrote books on his ideas and lectured around the country in hopes of reforming the practice of psychiatry. He died on October 18, 1981. His daughter Suzanne Baars carries on his work.

== Works ==
=== Books ===
- Baars, Conrad W., I Will Give Them A New Heart: Reflections on the Priesthood and the Renewal of the Church, Suzanne M. Baars and Bonnie N. Shayne (eds.). Staten Island, NY: ST PAULS/Alba House, 2008.
- Baars, Conrad W., Feeling and Healing Your Emotions, Rev. ed. Suzanne M. Baars and Bonnie N. Shayne (eds.). Plainfield, NJ: Logos International, 1979, Gainesville, FL: Bridge-Logos, 2003.
- Baars, Conrad W., Born Only Once: The Miracle of Affirmation, Quincy, Ill: Franciscan Press, Quincy University, 2001.
- Baars, Conrad W., Doctor of the Heart, Staten Island, NY: Alba House, 1996.
- Baars, Conrad W. & Anna A. Terruwe. Healing the Unaffirmed: Recognizing Emotional Deprivation Disorder, Rev. ed. Suzanne M. Baars and Bonnie N. Shayne (eds.). Staten Island, NY: ST PAULS/Alba House, 2002. (Previously published by Alba House as Healing the Unaffirmed: Recognizing Deprivation Neurosis.)
- Terruwe, Anna. A & Conrad W. Baars. Psychic Wholeness and Healing: Using All The Powers of the Human Psyche, Staten Island, NY: Alba House, 1981.
- Aumann, Jordan and Conrad W. Baars. The Unquiet Heart, Staten Island, NY: Alba House, 1991.
- Terruwe, A. A., & Baars, C. W. (1972). Loving and curing the neurotic: A new look at emotional illness. New Rochelle, NY: Arlington House.

=== Pamphlets ===
The following pamphlets in the Synthesis Series by Franciscan Press are now available as part of the newly published book I Will Give Them A New Heart: Reflections on the Priesthood and the Renewal of the Church. (See information above.)

- Baars, Conrad W., How to Treat and Prevent The Crisis in the Priesthood, Chicago, Ill: Franciscan Press, 1972.
- Baars, Conrad W., A Priest for All Seasons: Masculine and Celibate, Chicago, Ill: Franciscan Press, 1972.
- Baars, Conrad W. The Homosexual's Search for Happiness, Chicago, Ill: Franciscan Press, 1976.
