= The Role of the Church in the Causation, Treatment and Prevention of the Crisis in the Priesthood =

1971 report by Conrad Baars

The Role of the Church in the Causation, Treatment and Prevention of the Crisis in the Priesthood, a report submitted to the General Assembly of the Synod of Bishops in Rome in 1971, by Dr Conrad Baars, a Dutch-born Catholic psychiatrist from Minnesota, and based on a study of 1500 priests, suggested that seminary training left priests poorly prepared for a lifetime of celibacy.

== Description ==
This report was published by Franciscan Herald Press in 1972 as How to Treat and Prevent the Crisis in the Priesthood. It was also expected to be published in 2006 by St. Paul's/Alba House as part of a book of essays on the priesthood and religious life.

1. "psychosexual immaturity expressed in heterosexual or homosexual activity was encountered often. Virtually all of these priests were ... suffering from a severe to moderate frustration neurosis”.
2. Less than 15% of priests in Europe and North America were emotionally fully developed;
3. Of the remaining 85%, 20–25% had "serious psychiatric difficulties" that they expressed through alcohol abuse, while 60–70% had less severe degrees of emotional immaturity.

Though the report suggested that immediate corrective action was needed, making ten recommendations, and one of those most active in the Synod was Cardinal Wojtyła, who on October 16, 1978, was elected Pope John Paul II, no implementation of the report's detailed recommendations followed.
