= Heiman Wertheim =

Dutch medical microbiologist

- Born: Heiman Frank Louis Wertheim; 1970 (age 55–56); The Hague, Netherlands
- Education: Leiden University; Erasmus University Rotterdam (PhD)
- Scientific career
- Fields: Medical microbiology
- Workplaces: Radboud University Medical Center

Heiman Frank Louis Wertheim (born 1970) is a Dutch medical microbiologist. He is professor of medical microbiology and head of the department at Radboud University Medical Center in Nijmegen. His work deals with antimicrobial resistance and with infection care and antibiotic use in places with limited resources. The University of Oxford employed him in Hanoi from 2006 to 2015; by the end he was running its clinical research unit there. He advises the World Health Organization as a member of its Strategic and Technical Advisory Group for Antimicrobial Resistance (STAG-AMR), and joined the Health Council of the Netherlands in 2023.

== Early life and education ==
Wertheim grew up partly abroad: born in The Hague in 1970, he lived with his parents in Panama between the ages of 13 and 15. Before they left he had travel vaccinations at the local health service, where cards showed which infectious diseases occurred where, and he has said this is what got him interested in the subject as a child.

He studied medicine at Leiden University from 1989 to 1997. He first meant to become a paediatrician, but changed course after he came across the field in the intensive care unit of the Sophia Children's Hospital in Rotterdam. His specialist training followed at Erasmus MC (1998 to 2005). Alongside it he took a master's degree in clinical epidemiology at the Netherlands Institute for Health Sciences. His doctoral thesis at Erasmus University Rotterdam, defended on 17 June 2005, was on nasal carriage of Staphylococcus aureus and how to prevent hospital infections with it.

== Career ==
After his training Wertheim was a staff physician in medical microbiology at Erasmus MC. At the end of 2006 the University of Oxford sent him to Hanoi to set up laboratory and research capacity for infectious diseases, as part of the research centre it already ran in Ho Chi Minh City. In 2012 he became director of the Oxford University Clinical Research Unit in Hanoi, a job he held until 2015 and which included coordinating research in Southeast Asia and Africa, mostly on antimicrobial resistance.

Late in 2015 he moved back to the Netherlands. Radboud University Medical Center made him professor and head of department at the start of 2016. Small bugs, big data: clinical microbiology in a digitising world was the title of his inaugural lecture, on 27 January 2017. The hospital's Center for Infectious Diseases is also chaired by him.

== Work ==
=== Vietnam ===
Shortly after his arrival in 2006, doctors in Vietnam were seeing cases of meningitis they could not explain. Wertheim's group found the cause, Streptococcus suis, a bacterium from pigs, and national guidelines against the infection came next. His research then turned mainly to antimicrobial resistance and antibiotic use. He led VINARES, a network of sixteen Vietnamese hospitals that tracked resistance, antibiotic use and hospital infections, and supervised the work of the Global Antibiotic Resistance Partnership in the country. According to Radboud University Medical Center, his work contributed to a national action plan against antibiotic resistance drawn up by the Vietnamese health ministry. In 2016 the ministry gave him its Medal for the People's Health for his contribution to infectious disease research in Vietnam.

=== Antibiotic use ===
In ten Vietnamese health centres, Wertheim tested whether a rapid C-reactive protein (CRP) test could reduce antibiotic use for respiratory infections. Patients who had the test were given antibiotics less often and recovered just as well. The study came out in The Lancet Global Health in 2016, with Wertheim as last author. In 2024 he and colleagues described CRP testing in the same journal as a cost-effective way to limit resistance in countries at different income levels.

With the Lebanese infectious disease specialist Souha Kanj he developed the AbxGuide for the International Society of Antimicrobial Chemotherapy (ISAC), a free online guide to targeted antibiotic treatment. He was a co-author of a 2024 series in The Lancet on antimicrobial resistance, published ahead of a United Nations meeting on the subject. In NRC he argued at the time for better diagnostics, such as the low-cost CRP test, and for government investment and purchase guarantees to make new antibiotics worth developing.

Wertheim is principal investigator of ABACUS, a project on how people in six countries in Africa and Asia obtain and use antibiotics. Its household surveys and pharmacy interviews showed that people often did not know which medicine they had been given, and that they mixed up antibiotics with painkillers and other drugs. He has argued that antibiotics should be recognisable by their appearance or label, and the project is developing labels with a QR code that leads to information videos.

=== Infection care in resource-limited settings ===
In 2022 Wertheim and colleagues from the Radboud Center for Infectious Diseases worked on infection care in Suriname, at the request of the country office of the Pan American Health Organization. With the Academic Hospital Paramaribo they ran a course on antibiotics for Surinamese doctors and one on infection prevention for other health workers.

de Volkskrant reported in August 2024 that he would travel to Ukraine to teach targeted antibiotic use. He has since worked in the country as a WHO consultant on infection prevention and antibiotic policy. From October 2024 he helped staff at City Hospital No. 4 in Dnipro introduce contact isolation, hand hygiene and prior approval for certain antibiotics, among other measures, and he published on the approach in The Lancet Infectious Diseases. He also worked with Ukrainian colleagues in Lviv on multidrug-resistant bacteria. On the Dutch current affairs programme Nieuwsuur in July 2024 he described war as a driving force behind infection problems.

Radboud University Medical Center points to its own SPICE programme (Specialized Programme for Infectious Disease Care Everywhere) as a comparable model. Set up in 2022, SPICE matches care facilities in resource-limited settings with mentors in infection prevention and antibiotic policy. Its roots lie in a 2019 collaboration between the medical microbiology department and the Dutch organisation PUM. Wertheim is one of the mentors, and in 2024 he co-wrote a description of the programme in the Nederlands Tijdschrift voor Medische Microbiologie. He had set out a similar plan in de Volkskrant in July 2017. The Netherlands, where few antibiotics are prescribed and resistance is low, should pass its knowledge on to other countries, he said, through a pool of several hundred experts, retired doctors and scientists among them, and through "buddy" hospitals that others could consult.

Through ISAC he also works to strengthen professional societies for infectious diseases and clinical microbiology. A global survey of 86 such societies in 62 countries, with Wertheim as first author, appeared in 2025. Many societies, particularly in low- and middle-income countries, reported few resources and little say in national action plans on antimicrobial resistance. The authors recommended international cooperation and mentoring. ISAC then made grants of up to €6,000 available, both for existing societies and for founding new ones where none existed.

=== Reference works ===
With Peter Horby and John P. Woodall, Wertheim edited the Atlas of Human Infectious Diseases (Wiley-Blackwell, 2012), which maps where infectious diseases occur and what shapes their spread. The idea went back to the cards he had seen as a child before leaving for Panama. At the book's launch he named the spread of resistant bacteria through growing travel, urbanisation and environmental change as causes of the rise in infectious diseases. Bruno Petruccelli's review in Emerging Infectious Diseases said the atlas set a new standard as a reference work for geographic medicine. Wertheim is also among the editors of the fifth edition (2024) of the Dutch textbook Leerboek microbiologie en infectieziekten.

== Advisory and board positions ==
On 6 April 2022 Wertheim became chair of the Dutch Society for Medical Microbiology (NVMM), where he had been secretary. He has since stepped down and is past chair. As chair he opposed the growth of commercial laboratory companies. He told the society's journal in 2022 that further commercialisation could cost the field its informal cooperation. In Trouw that July he and the German infectious disease specialist Alex Friedrich wrote that outsourcing medical tests to commercial laboratories was risky and could hollow out infectious disease care. In July 2024 he criticised the Dutch care group Alrijne in NRC for calling its laboratory a supplier, after problems with a new external laboratory service had forced it to close some wards for nearly a week.

The Centre for Infectious Disease Control at the National Institute for Public Health and the Environment had him on its advisory board in 2022. A royal decree appointed him to the Health Council of the Netherlands for four years from 1 January 2023, and he serves on the council's advisory committee (Beraadsgroep). His WHO advisory group membership dates from 2024. He is a board member of the Alliance for the Prudent Use of Antibiotics and president-elect of ISAC.

== Public role ==
Dutch media regularly ask Wertheim about antimicrobial resistance and medicine shortages. In 2018 he took part in a Zembla programme on the production of cheap antibiotics in India, in which he named low-cost manufacturing in countries with weaker rules as one cause of resistance. In January 2019 he and Jan Kluytmans wrote in NRC that antibiotic shortages needed a European response, as the Netherlands had come to depend too much on production in China and India. In September 2025 he and the regional health service GGD Gelderland-Zuid warned in De Gelderlander of a "silent pandemic" of resistant bacteria.

In March 2020, early in the COVID-19 pandemic, the NVMM, of which he was then a board member, urged the Dutch public health institute to improve its information, and Wertheim explained why in a Nieuwsuur article. Later that month he told NRC he was spending whole days trying to collect testing materials, and again pointed to the reliance on cheap production abroad. As a member of the hospital's outbreak team he explained to the broadcaster NOS how it was dealing with the shortage of face masks. He also helped write the national guidance on infection prevention in hospital care for suspected and confirmed COVID-19 patients, as a member of an expert team of the Federation of Medical Specialists. In July 2021 he warned that fully vaccinated people could catch and pass on the Delta variant without noticing.

In November 2021 he warned in De Gelderlander of a rapid rise in scabies, especially among students, and called for a national approach with better public information. A year later, in the Algemeen Dagblad, he proposed giving ivermectin to at-risk groups on a large scale, along with contact tracing and possibly mandatory reporting.

== Honours ==
- Medal for the People's Health, Vietnamese Ministry of Health (2016)

== Selected publications ==
- Staphylococcus aureus infections; lead by the nose (PhD thesis, Erasmus University Rotterdam, 2005)
- Atlas of Human Infectious Diseases (edited with Peter Horby and John P. Woodall, Wiley-Blackwell, 2012)
- Small bugs, big data: clinical microbiology in a digitising world (inaugural lecture, Radboud University, 2017)
- Leerboek microbiologie en infectieziekten (co-editor, fifth edition, Bohn Stafleu van Loghum, 2024)
