= Mark Retera =

Dutch cartoonist

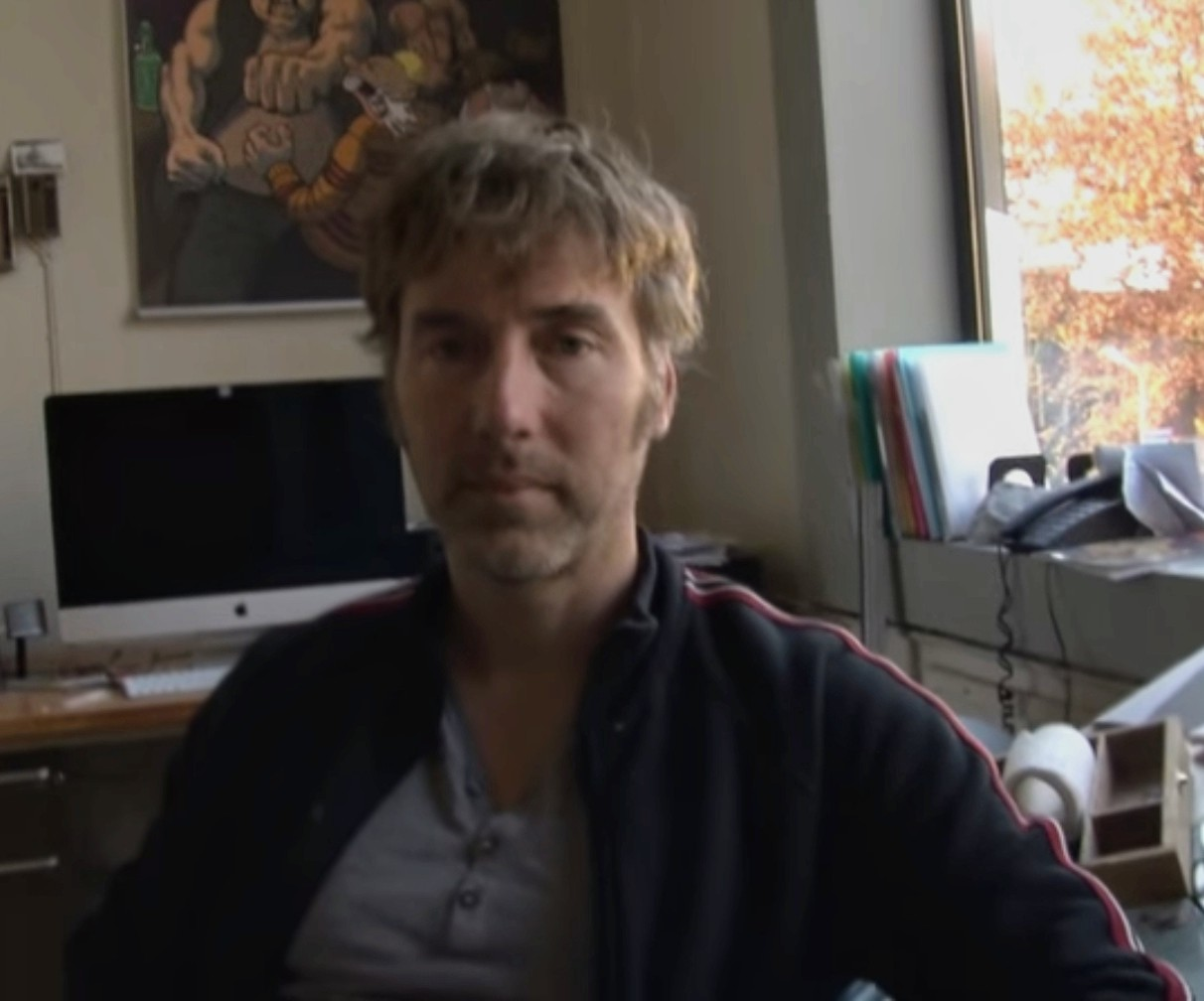
Mark Retera, 2015

Mark Retera (born 16 May 1964, Eindhoven) is a Dutch cartoonist, best known for his absurd gag comic DirkJan. He is the winner of the 2004 Stripschapprijs. He also draws caricatures for the Dutch weekly Panorama.

Retera studied cognitive science at the current Radboud University Nijmegen before turning full-time artist.
