= Nano-Micro Letters =

- Discipline: Nanotechnology, materials science
- Language: English
- Edited by: Yafei Zhang

Publication details
- History: 2009–present
- Publisher: Springer Science+Business Media on behalf of Shanghai Jiao Tong University
- Open access: Yes
- License: Creative Commons Attribution
- Impact factor: 31.6 (2023)

Standard abbreviations
- ISO 4: Nano-Micro Lett.

Indexing
- ISSN: 2311-6706
- OCLC no.: 922666694

Links
- Journal homepage; Online archive

Nano-Micro Letters is a peer-reviewed open-access scientific journal covering nanotechnology. It is published by Springer Science+Business Media on behalf of Shanghai Jiao Tong University. The editor-in-chief is Yafei Zhang (Shanghai Jiao Tong University). The journal was established in 2009.

== Abstracting and indexing ==
The journal is abstracted and indexed in the Science Citation Index Expanded and Scopus. According to the Journal Citation Reports, the journal has a 2023 impact factor of 31.6.
