= Radboud University Medical Center =

Coordinates: 51°49′23″N 5°51′45″E

Geography
- Location: Nijmegen, Netherlands

Organisation
- Type: Teaching
- Affiliated university: Radboud University

Services
- Emergency department: Yes, Level I Trauma Center
- Beds: 1,065

History
- Founded: 1956; 70 years ago

Links
- Website: radboudumc.nl
- Lists: Hospitals in Netherlands

The Radboud University Medical Center (Dutch: Radboudumc) is the teaching hospital affiliated with Radboud University, in the city of Nijmegen in the eastern-central part of the Netherlands.

The Radboud University Medical Center was founded in 1956. It changed its name to UMC St Radboud and transformed to a complete new organization in 1999 by a merger of the Academisch Ziekenhuis Nijmegen (AZN) (Academic Hospital of Nijmegen) and the medical faculty of the Katholieke Universiteit Nijmegen (Catholic University of Nijmegen), now the Radboud University. Thus, it is a semi-independent medical university and hospital, which is not directly linked to the Radboud University. In 2013 the hospital changed its name to Radboudumc in Dutch and Radboud University Medical Center in English.

It is one of the largest and leading hospitals of the Netherlands, providing supraregional tertiary care for residents of a large part of the eastern section of the Netherlands.

The medical center has about 1,000 beds, employs about 10,000 employees, and offers educational services to about 3,000 students in the following academic courses:

- Medicine
- Biomedical Sciences
- Dentistry
- Molecular Mechanisms of Disease
- Cognitive Neurosciences

== Research ==
The medical center's infrastructure consists of several technology centers and three research institutes:

- Radboud Institute for Molecular Life Sciences
- Radboud Institute for Health Sciences
- The Donders Center for Medical Neuroscience within the Donders Center for Brain, Cognition and Behaviour and several technology centers

The scientists perform cross-disciplinary research regarding 18 clinically relevant research themes.
