= Robert Regout (Jesuit) =

Dutch Jesuit, jurist and resistance fighter during the Second World War

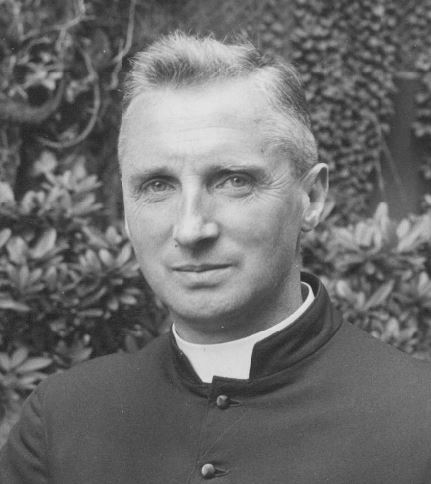

Robert Hubert Willem Regout (18 January 1896 – 28 December 1942) was a Dutch Jesuit, jurist, and resistance fighter during the Second World War. A specialist in public international law, he was arrested by the German occupation authorities in 1941 and died in Dachau concentration camp the following year.
