= Peter Gottfried Kremsner =

Austrian physician

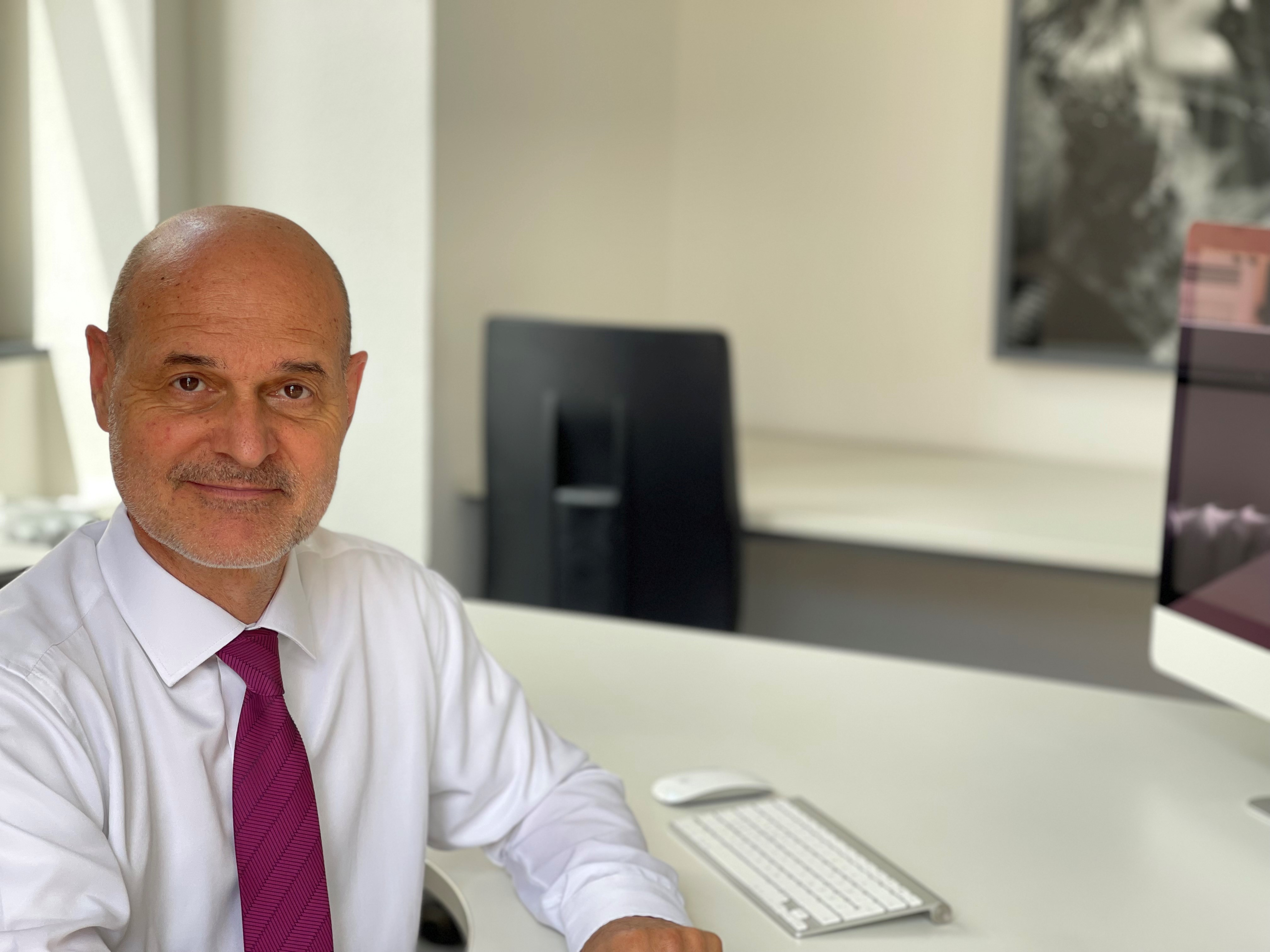
- Peter Gottfried Kremsner in his office
- Born: 16 May 1961 (age 65); Wiener Neustadt, Austria
- Education: University of Vienna (MD, 1985)
- Spouse: Inge Thomforde
- Children: 3 (Helene, Gottfried, Ferdinand)

Peter Gottfried Kremsner (born 16 May 1961 in Wiener Neustadt, Austria) is a specialist in tropical medicine and Full Professor at the University of Tübingen, Germany. Since 1992 he has been leading the Centre de Recherches Médicales de Lambaréné (CERMEL), Gabon, now as president.

== Biography ==
Kremsner grew up in Sigleß, Austria. He studied medicine at the University of Vienna, graduating in 1985 as Doctor of Medicine. He started his academic career as a medical researcher at the Institute of Specific Prophylaxis and Tropical Medicine, University of Vienna. 1987 he went to Brazil working there for the Superintendencia de Campanhas de Saude Publica at Rio Branco. From 1988 to 1996 he held the position of a group leader at the Institute of Tropical Medicine in Berlin. In 1990 he earned his habilitation for Tropical Medicine and Specific Prophylaxis at the University of Vienna and 1992 an additional habilitation for Tropical Medicine and Parasitology at the Humboldt University of Berlin.

In 1992 Kremsner started the medical research center in Lambaréné, now Centre de Recherches Médicales de Lambaréné (CERMEL), and made it one of the premier research and training centers in Africa. In 1996 Kremsner was appointed Professor for Parasitology at the University of Tübingen. Since 2008 he has been Chairman and Professor for Tropical Medicine, Travel Medicine and Parasitology at Tübingen University as well as Director of the Institute for Tropical Medicine. In 2014 he was additionally appointed CEO of the Comprehensive Infectious Disease Center of University Hospital Tübingen. In 2016 he became also adjunct professor at the Medical University of Vienna.

== Research ==
Kremsner led numerous studies on tropical infectious diseases and is author of more than 700 scientific publications. Since the 1990s he is the most cited scientist in the field of parasitology in Germany and currently the most cited scientist in the fields of parasitology, tropical medicine and travel medicine in Europe (EU). He has been principal investigator on key studies for the development of atovaquone/proguanil, artesunate/amodiaquine, artesunate/pyronaridine and parenteral artesunate for malaria therapy and prophylaxis. Kremsner and his team developed a simplified method for assessment of severity of malaria. Outcome can now be predicted and therapy focused by health care providers using the "Lambaréné Score", which uses two clinical characteristics, coma and deep breathing without laboratory assessment. This was accomplished by using data from a study in 26,000 children with severe malaria in Africa led by him. Kremsner took part in the phase 3 testing of the malaria vaccine, RTS,S/AS01, as a member of the governing clinical trial partnership committee and coordinator of clinical trials in Lambaréné. Since 2011, he and his team are working on development of other malaria vaccines, notably PfSPZ-based vaccines in cooperation with Sanaria Inc. Together with colleagues, he established a Plasmodium falciparum controlled human malaria infection (CHMI) model in Tübingen und Lambaréné. The Use of CHMI models dramatically reduces the time needed for clinical development of malaria vaccine and drug candidates. A study carried out in Tübingen evaluating a PfSPZ vaccine applying a CHMI model showed 100 percent protection against the homologous malaria strain.

Kremsner led the phase 2b/3 vaccine trial of CureVac's Covid-19 vaccine candidate CVnCoV, which was withdrawn in October 2021.

== Personal life ==
Kremsner is married to the lawyer Inge Thomforde. They have three children (Helene, Gottfried and Ferdinand). He is interested in classical music, arts and literature. In addition to his citizenship of the European Union (Austrian), Kremsner is also a Gabonese citizen.

== Awards ==
- EDCTP Dr. Pascoal Mocumbi Prize, 2023
- Knight of the National Order of Merit of Gabon, 2018
- Honorary Professor of the Institute of Clinical Medical and Pharmaceutical Sciences, Hanoi, Vietnam, 2018
- International Honorary Fellow of American Society of Tropical Medicine and Hygiene, 2017
- Memento Research Prize for neglected diseases, 2017
- Charles C. Shepard Science Award, 2015
- Grand Prix of the Gabonese National Centre for Scientific and Technological Research (CENAREST), 2010
- Fellow of the Royal College of Physicians, London, 2003
- Karl Hermann Spitzy Prize for Chemotherapy, 1990

== Selected publications ==
- Lell B, Mordmüller B, Dejon Agobe JC, Honkpehedji J, Zinsou J, Mengue JB, Loembe MM, Adegnika AA, Held J, Lalremruata A, Nguyen TT, Esen M, Kc N, Ruben AJ, Chakravarty S, Lee Sim BK, Billingsley PF, James ER, Richie TL, Hoffman SL, Kremsner PG (February 2018). "Impact of Sickle Cell Trait and Naturally Acquired Immunity on Uncomplicated Malaria after Controlled Human Malaria Infection in Adults in Gabon". The American Journal of Tropical Medicine and Hygiene. 98 (2): 508–515. doi:10.4269/ajtmh.17-0343. PMC 5929186. PMID 29260650.
- Mordmüller B, Surat G, Lagler H, Chakravarty S, Ishizuka AS, Lalremruata A, Gmeiner M, Campo JJ, Esen M, Ruben AJ, Held J, Calle CL, Mengue JB, Gebru T, Ibáñez J, Sulyok M, James ER, Billingsley PF, Natasha KC, Manoj A, Murshedkar T, Gunasekera A, Eappen AG, Li T, Stafford RE, Li M, Felgner PL, Seder RA, Richie TL, Sim BK, Hoffman SL, Kremsner PG (February 2017). "Sterile protection against human malaria by chemoattenuated PfSPZ vaccine". Nature. 542 (7642): 445–449. Bibcode:2017Natur.542..445M. doi:10.1038/nature21060. PMC 10906480. PMID 28199305. S2CID 205253429.
- Kremsner PG, Adegnika AA, Hounkpatin AB, Zinsou JF, Taylor TE, Chimalizeni Y, Liomba A, Kombila M, Bouyou-Akotet MK, Mawili Mboumba DP, Agbenyega T, Ansong D, Sylverken J, Ogutu BR, Otieno GA, Wangwe A, Bojang KA, Okomo U, Sanya-Isijola F, Newton CR, Njuguna P, Kazungu M, Kerb R, Geditz M, Schwab M, Velavan TP, Nguetse C, Köhler C, Issifou S, Bolte S, Engleitner T, Mordmüller B, Krishna S (January 2016). "Intramuscular Artesunate for Severe Malaria in African Children: A Multicenter Randomized Controlled Trial". PLOS Medicine. 13 (1) e1001938. doi:10.1371/journal.pmed.1001938. PMC 4710539. PMID 26757276.
- Rts, S Clinical Trials Partnership (July 2015). "Efficacy and safety of RTS,S/AS01 malaria vaccine with or without a booster dose in infants and children in Africa: final results of a phase 3, individually randomised, controlled trial". Lancet. 386 (9988): 31–45. doi:10.1016/S0140-6736(15)60721-8. PMC 5626001. PMID 25913272.
- Mordmüller B, Supan C, Sim KL, Gómez-Pérez GP, Ospina Salazar CL, Held J, Bolte S, Esen M, Tschan S, Joanny F, Lamsfus Calle C, Löhr SJ, Lalremruata A, Gunasekera A, James ER, Billingsley PF, Richman A, Chakravarty S, Legarda A, Muñoz J, Antonijoan RM, Ballester MR, Hoffman SL, Alonso PL, Kremsner PG (March 2015). "Direct venous inoculation of Plasmodium falciparum sporozoites for controlled human malaria infection: a dose-finding trial in two centres". Malaria Journal. 14 117. doi:10.1186/s12936-015-0628-0. PMC 4371633. PMID 25889522.
- Lell B, Luckner D, Ndjavé M, Scott T, Kremsner PG (March 1998). "Randomised placebo-controlled study of atovaquone plus proguanil for malaria prophylaxis in children". Lancet. 351 (9104): 709–13. doi:10.1016/S0140-6736(97)09222-2. PMID 9504515. S2CID 33542902.
