= Marlies Reinders =

Dutch physician and academic administrator

Marlies E. J. Reinders (born 1973) is a Dutch internist-nephrologist and academic administrator. Since 1 October 2024, she has worked as dean of the Faculty of Medicine at Leiden University and as a member of the executive board of Leiden University Medical Center (LUMC). She was appointed professor of Internal Medicine in 2017 and previously worked as head of Nephrology and Kidney Transplantation at Erasmus MC and chair of the Erasmus MC Transplant Institute.

== Education and career ==
Reinders studied medicine at the University of Groningen. During her doctoral research, she worked in Boston at Boston Children's Hospital and Harvard Medical School in the field of kidney transplantation. She received her PhD from Leiden University with a thesis on the relationship between angiogenesis and immunity in transplantation. Reinders later worked as an internist-nephrologist at Leiden University Medical Center from 2009 to 2020. In 2020, she moved to Erasmus MC, where she became head of Nephrology and Kidney Transplantation; from 2023 to 2024, she also chaired the Erasmus MC Transplant Institute. In 2024, Leiden University and LUMC announced her appointment as dean of the Faculty of Medicine and a member of the LUMC Board of Directors.

== Research and academic work ==
Her research has focused on clinical kidney transplantation and transplantation medicine. She was a co-investigator in the Dutch RECOVAC consortium, which studied the impact of COVID-19 vaccination and infection on patients with kidney disease. She has also worked on educational innovation, including the development of the Massive Open Online Course (MOOC) Clinical Kidney, Pancreas and Islet Transplantation, launched in 2016.

== Professional service ==
Reinders worked as chair of the Dutch Transplant Society from 2016 to 2021 and has been a member of the Eurotransplant Board. She has also worked on education committees of the European Society for Organ Transplantation (ESOT) and The Transplantation Society (TSS). In 2017, she was among a group of Dutch transplantation specialists who publicly argued for a new organ donation law in the Netherlands.

Reinders serves on the supervisory boards of Medical Delta and RegMed XB. In 2026, she commented on renewed Novo Nordisk Foundation funding for LUMC's participation in the reNEW regenerative medicine consortium.
