= Homunculus loxodontus =

Statue by Margriet van Breevoort

Homunculus Loxodontus
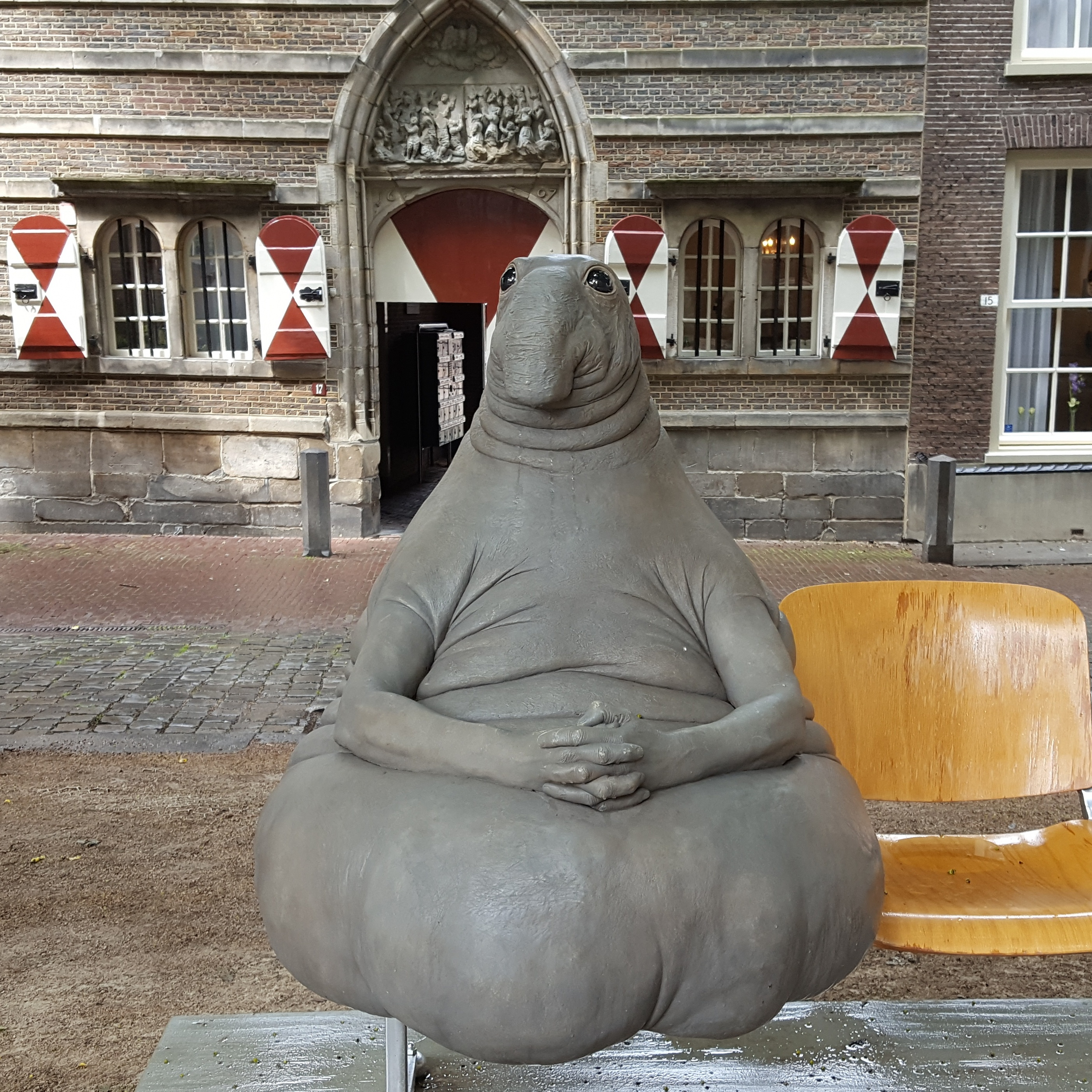
- Artist: Margriet van Breevoort
- Year: 2016
- Location: Leiden University Medical Center, Leiden, Netherlands

Homunculus Loxodontus (nicknamed Zhdun, "The One Who Waits", Snorp, or WOSH) is a statue by Dutch artist Margriet van Breevoort. It was made for the Leiden University Medical Center and installed in the spring of 2016. It became popular in post-Soviet countries where it is called Ждун (Russian informal term for "one who waits").

== Composition ==
The sculpture depicts a legless, gray creature with the head of a northern elephant seal, a larval body, and human arms clasped together in front of it. It sits on a waiting room chair, and, according to the sculptor, the figure symbolizes the emotions of people who wait at the doctor's office. The sculpture is made of plastic and epoxy resin, which, when mixed, form a clay-like substance that feels hard and rough to the touch.

== History ==
In May 2016, the figure was installed in front of the children's hospital at the Leiden University Medical Center, but as of February 2017 is now displayed alongside other works of art inside the medical center.

The Leiden University Medical Center originally awarded artist Margriet van Breevoort a grant to create the sculpture for an annual art competition held by the Leiden Sculpture Foundation, where the sculptural theme for 2016 competition was biological sciences. Brevoort did not want to depict something related to the grim side of medicine or disease, and instead focused on the patients, ordinary people waiting to see a doctor for a diagnosis. According to her, the sculpture meant to convey the message that "you should calmly wait for diagnosis with hope for the best", and was intended to look humorous, but also cute and huggable.

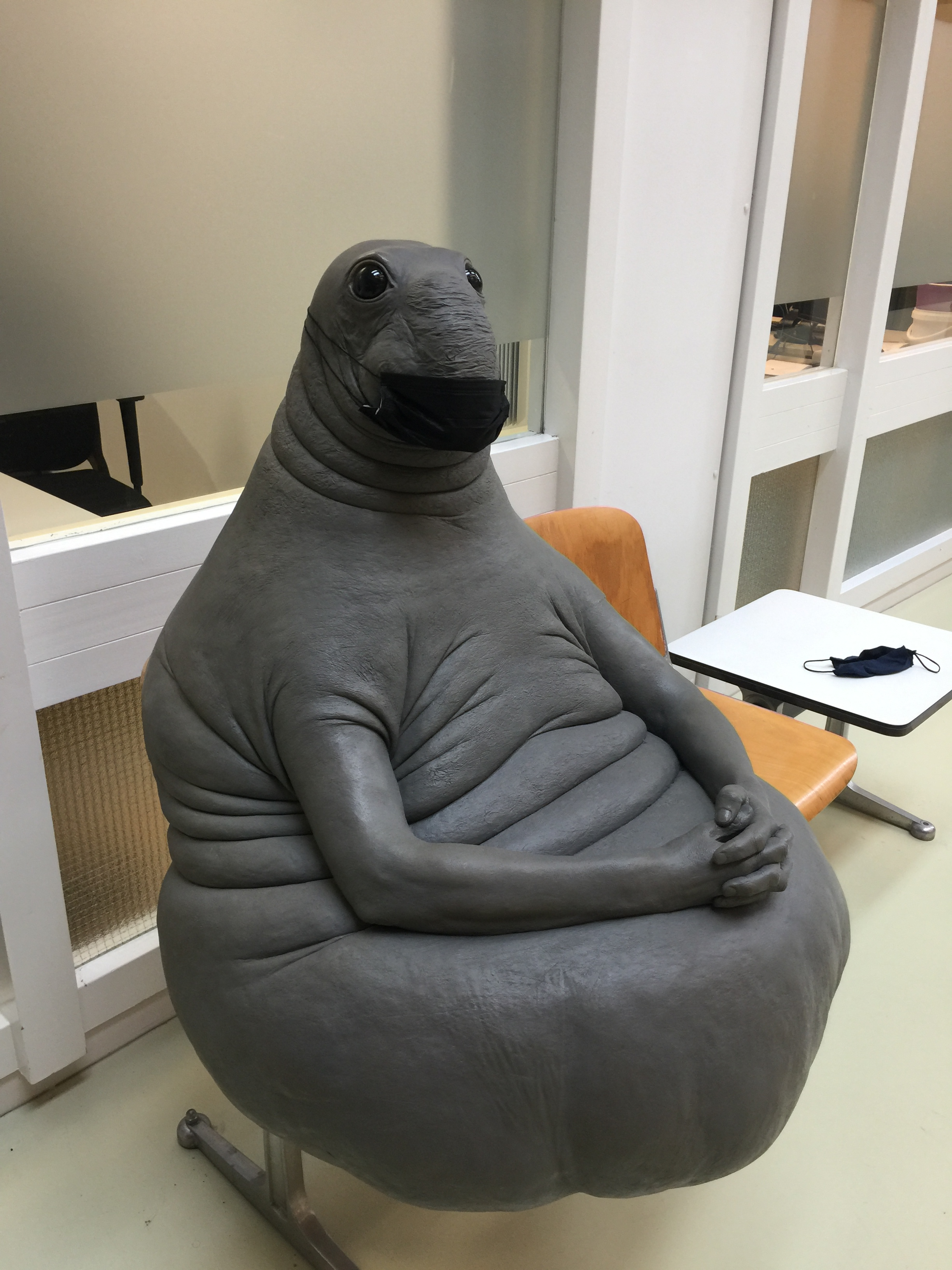
The statue in 2021 with a face mask

In 2016, the sculpture was named the most photographed attraction in Leiden. In Chita, a copy of Zhdun's sculpture was installed on the retro site of the House of Officers Park in 2017.

In 2021 due to COVID-19, a face mask was added on the sculpture across the nose, which has since been removed.

== Internet meme ==
After being posted on the social network Pikabu in 2017, the sculpture (renamed Zhdun, or "Awaiter") became an Internet meme in a number of Eastern European countries, e.g. Russia and Ukraine, in which it is edited into famous paintings, photographs, videos, and other visual media. Models have been photographed in locales including an empty seat in the Ukrainian Parliament.

CD Land, a media company, bought the Russian media rights for five years starting in 2017. The cover of the 2021 album Sand by Belgian indie pop-rock band Balthazar features Zhdun.

== Movie adaptation ==
In March 2025, a film titled Ждун в кино (translated to Snorp: My Alien Friend) was released in Russia. The film features the Homunculus Loxodontus (named Zhdun), voiced by Karen Arutyunov, who crashes down to earth and is being hidden by the family that found him. He is trying to find a specific mineral, revealed to be salt, while a tech company tries to steal his spaceship for their own gain. On April 30, 2026, the sequel to the film, Ждун 2 (Snorp: My Alien Friend 2), was released.

== See also ==
- Stoned Fox
