= Margriet van Breevoort =

Dutch sculptor (born 1990)

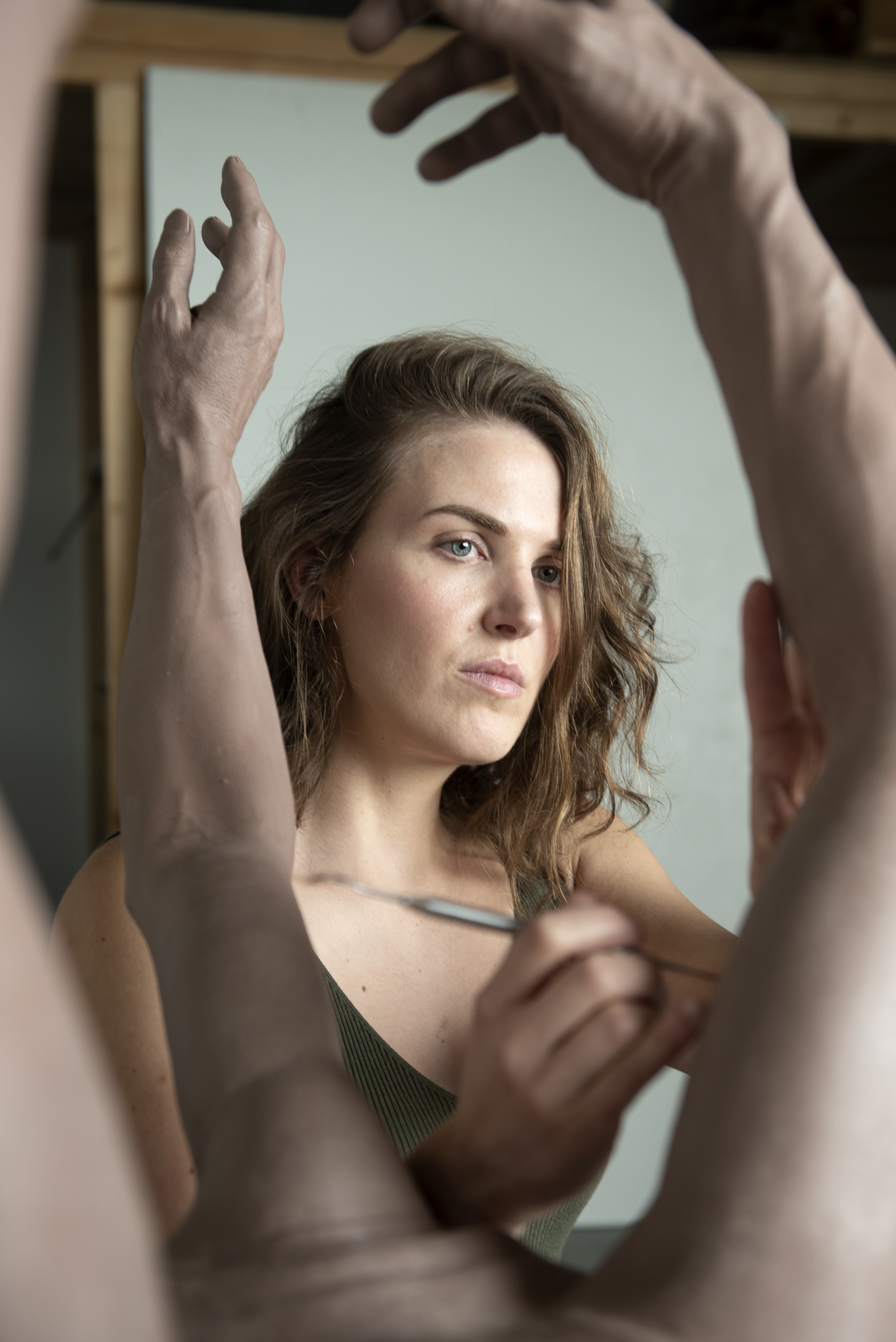
- Breevoort in 2016
- Born: 22 June 1990 (age 36); Amsterdam, Netherlands
- Occupation: Artist
- Notable work: homunculus loxodontus
- Website: https://margrietvanbreevoort.com

Margriet van Breevoort (Amsterdam, 22 June 1990) is a Dutch sculptor.

== Life and work ==
Van Breevoort followed an orientation year at the Royal Academy of Visual Arts in The Hague (2007-2008) and then studied at the Hogeschool voor de Kunsten Utrecht (2008-2013). She makes drawings and hyper-realistic sculptures, deliberately misleading the viewer.

Van Breevoort received a work contribution for Young Talent in 2016 from the Mondriaan Fund. In the same year she won the audience award at the annual sculpture exhibition Sculptures in Leiden with her sculpture Homunculus Loxodontus. The statue was purchased by the Leids University Medical Center and placed at the main entrance of the hospital. The work became a true internet hit in Russia and the surrounding area. She signed a licensing contract with a Russian company that will transform the image into a children's film.

== Selected works ==
- 2015: Twisted Fairy Tales, Kanaleneiland Neighborhood Service Center, Utrecht
- 2016: Homunculus Loxodontus, collection Leiden University Medical Center
- 2016: The tourist, collection Museum Arnhem
- 2017: The waiting, collection Buitenplaats Doornburgh
- 2019: Leo Mare Unicornicus, coll. LUMC
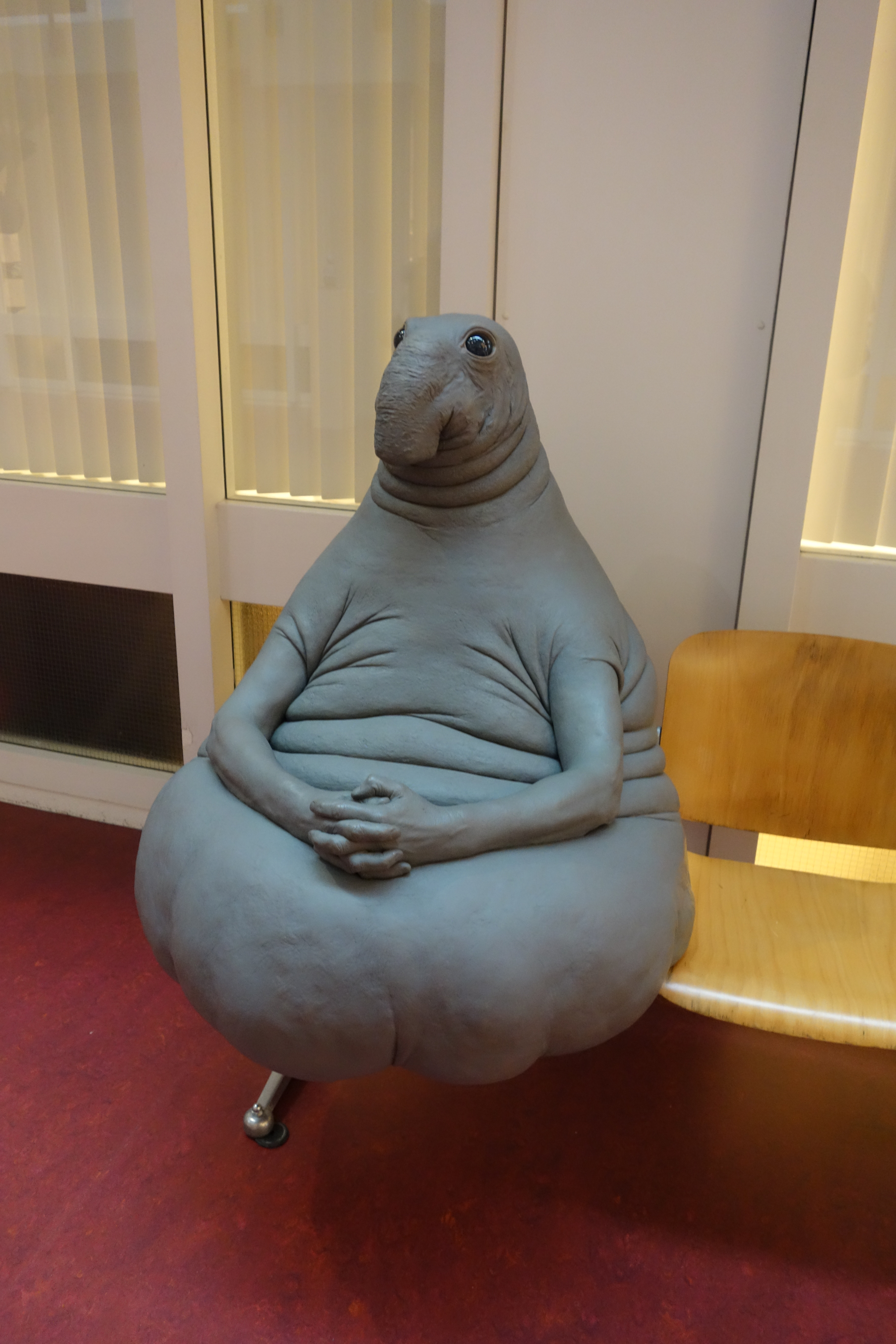
Homunculus Loxodontus

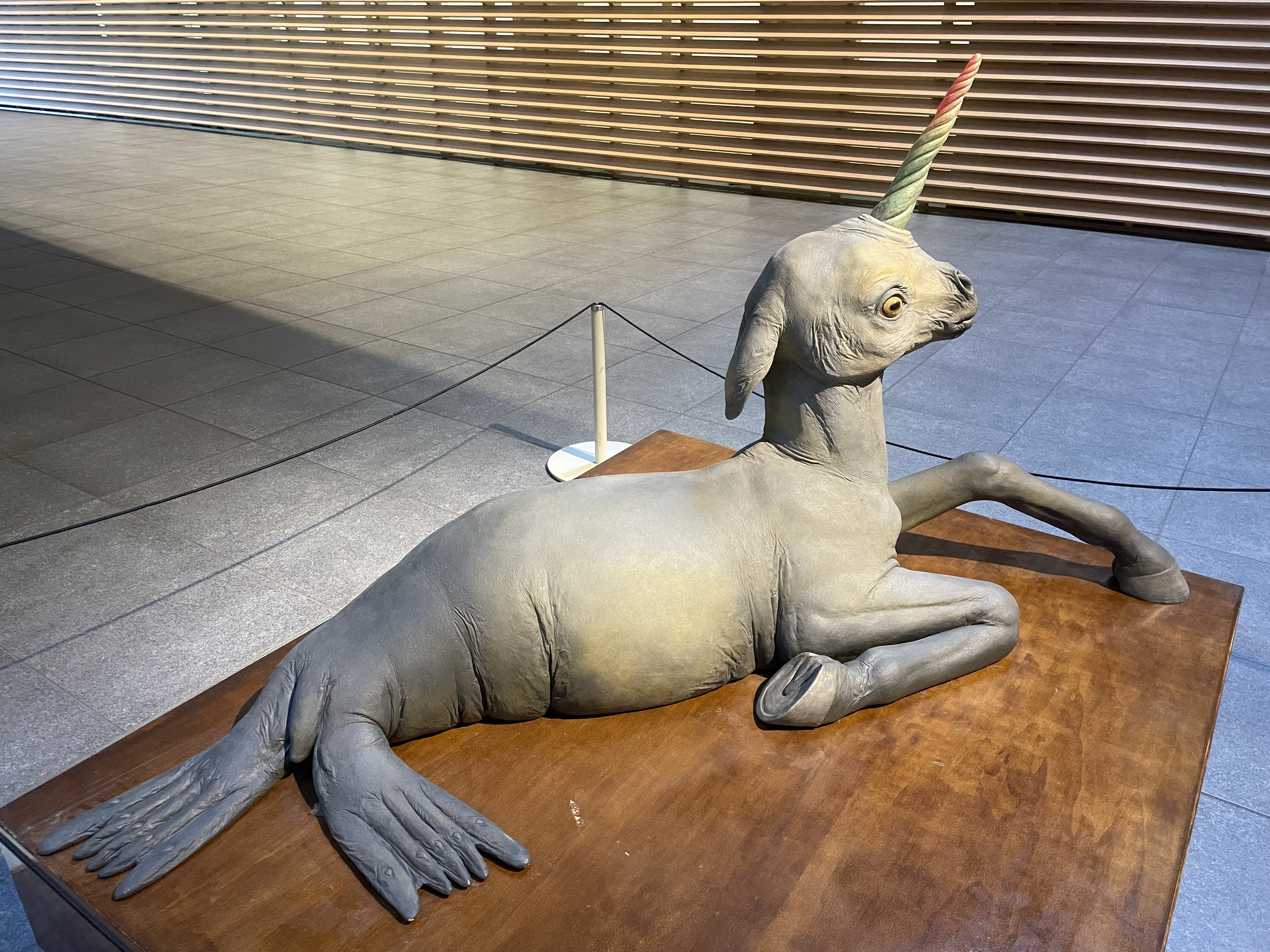
Leo Mare Unicornicus
