= Cryoconservation of animal genetic resources =

Animal gene preservation at very low temperatures

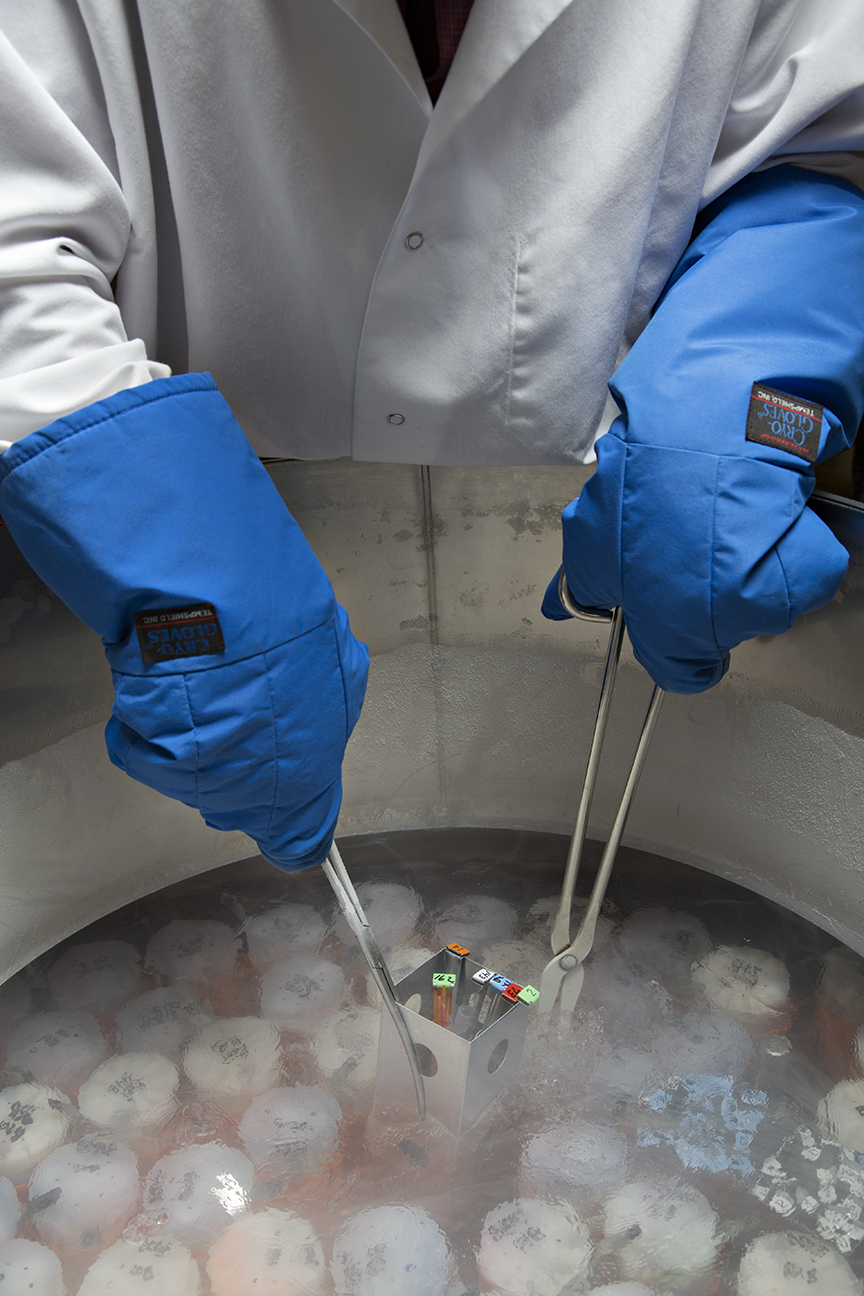
Cryoconservation of animal genetic resources at the USDA Gene Bank

Cryoconservation of animal genetic resources is a strategy wherein samples of animal genetic materials are preserved cryogenically.

Animal genetic resources, as defined by the Food and Agriculture Organization of the United Nations, are "those animal species that are used, or may be used, for the production of food and agriculture, and the populations within each of them. These populations within each species can be classified as wild and feral populations, landraces and primary populations, standardised breeds, selected lines, varieties, strains and any conserved genetic material; all of which are currently categorized as Breeds." Genetic materials that are typically cryogenically preserved include sperm (such as in a sperm bank), oocytes, embryos and somatic cells. Cryogenic facilities are called gene banks and can vary greatly in size usually according to the economic resources available. They must be able to facilitate germplasm collection, processing, and long term storage, all in a hygienic and organized manner. Gene banks must maintain a precise database and make information and genetic resources accessible to properly facilitate cryoconservation. Cryoconservation is an ex situ conservation strategy that often coexists alongside in situ conservation to protect and preserve livestock genetics.

Cryoconservation of livestock genetic resources is primarily done in order to preserve the genetics of populations of interest, such as indigenous breeds, also known as local or minor breeds. Material may be stored because individuals shared specific genes and phenotypes that may be of value or have potential value for researchers or breeders. Therefore, one of the main goals remains preserving the gene pool of local breeds that may be threatened. Indigenous livestock genetics are commonly threatened by factors such as globalization, modernization, changes in production systems, inappropriate introduction of major breeds, genetic drift, inbreeding, crossbreeding, climate change, natural disasters, disease, cultural changes, and urbanization. Indigenous livestock are critical to sustainable agricultural development and food security, due to their: adaptation to environment and endemic diseases, indispensable part in local production systems, cultural significance, and importance to local rural economies. The genetic resources of minor breeds have value to the local farmers, consumers of the products, private companies and investors interested in crossbreeding, breed associations, governments, those conducting research and development, and non-governmental organizations. Therefore, efforts have been made by national governments and non-governmental organizations, such as The Livestock Conservancy, to encourage conservation of livestock genetics through cryoconservation, as well as through other ex situ and in situ strategies. Cryogenic specimens of livestock genetic resources can be preserved and used for extended periods of time. This advantage makes cryoconservation beneficial particularly for threatened breeds who have low breed populations. Cryogenically preserved specimens can be used to revive breeds that are endangered or extinct, for breed improvement, crossbreeding, research and development. However, cryoconservation can be an expensive strategy and requires long term hygienic and economic commitment for germplasms to remain viable. Cryoconservation can also face unique challenges based on the species, as some species have a reduced survival rate of frozen germplasm.

== Description ==
Cryoconservation is the process of freezing cells and tissues using liquid nitrogen to achieve extreme low temperatures with the intent of using the preserved sample to prevent the loss of genetic diversity. Semen, embryos, oocytes, somatic cells, nuclear DNA, and other types of biomaterial such as blood and serum can be stored using cryopreservation, in order to preserve genetic materials. The primary benefit of cryoconservation is the ability to save germplasms for extended periods of time, therefore maintaining the genetic diversity of a species or breed. There are two common techniques of cryopreservation: slow freezing and vitrification. Slow freezing helps eliminate the risk of intracellular ice crystals. If ice crystals form in the cells, there can be damage or destruction of genetic material. Vitrification is the process of freezing without the formation of ice crystals.

== Value ==
Cryoconservation is an indispensable tool in the storage of genetic material of animal origin and will continue to be useful for the conservation of livestock into the future. Cryoconservation serves as a way to preserve germplasms, which is particularly beneficial for threatened breeds. Indigenous livestock may be conserved for a variety of reasons, including the preservation of local genetics, their importance in local traditions and their value to the culture identity and heritage of the area. The loss of regional livestock diversity could increase instability, decreases future possibilities and challenge production systems. Moreover, the maintenance of indigenous breeds can aid in the preservation of traditional lifestyles and livelihoods, even providing income through cultural tourism. Indigenous breeds can contribute to local economies and production systems by utilising land that is unsuitable for crop production to produce food products, as well as providing hides, manure and draft power. Therefore, the conservation and progression of these breeds are of the utmost importance for food security and sustainability.

Another beneficial factor in cryoconservation of indigenous livestock is in terms of food security and economic development. Indigenous livestock often have beneficial traits related to adaptation to local climate and diseases that can be incorporated into major breeds through cryoconservation practices. Cryoconservation is a favorable strategy because it allows germplasms to be stored for extended periods of time in a small confined area. An additional benefit of cryoconservation is the ability to preserve the biological material of both maternal and paternal cells and maintain viability over extended periods of time. Cryoconservation has been successfully used as a conservation strategy for species and breeds that have since been endangered. One drawback is that cryoconservation can only be done if preparation has taken place in advance. With proper preparation of collecting and maintaining genetic material, this method is very beneficial for the conservation of rare and endangered livestock. Cryoconservation can serve as a contingency plan when a breed population needs to be restored or when a breed has become extinct, as well as for breed improvement. This process benefits companies and researchers by making genetic materials available.

Conservation Goals
Flexibility of country's AGR to meet changes	Insurance against changes in production conditions	Safeguarding against diseases, disasters, etc.	Opportunities for genomic research
Genetic Factors	Allowing continued breed evolution/genetic adaption	Increasing knowledge of phenotypic characteristics of breed	Minimizing exposed to genetic drafts
Sustainable utilization of total areas	Opportunities for development in rural areas	Maintenance of agro-ecosystem diversity	Conservation of rural culture diversity

The support of numerous stakeholders make this process possible in the establishment and operations of cryoconservation. Before every phase is executed, all participating stakeholders must be briefed to understand the possible phase impending. This would include informing the stakeholders of their responsibilities and receiving their consent for the cryoconservation process. The possible stakeholders within the cryoconservation process could include:

- The State-the government acquires responsibility for conservation of animal genetic resources
- Individual Livestock Keepers and Breed Associations-individual livestock keepers are commonly the primary owners of the livestock whose germplasm is used for processes of cryoconservation. Breed Associations would be interested in the well-being of their respective breeds in short and long terms. Through this interest these associations may provide financial and organizational support for the cryoconservation process.
- Private Companies-including, but, not limited to, commercial breeding companies, processing companies and agricultural support services may find value in the cryoconservation process and may striving to become more involved.
- The National Coordinator for the Management of Animal Genetic Resources-this particular stakeholder would possibly a member of the National Advisory Committee on Animal Genetic Resources. This member needs to be knowledgeable about all aspects and activities of cryoconservation, as this stakeholder would have the responsibility of reporting current information to the FAO.

== Methods ==
=== Collection ===
There are several ways to collect the genetic materials based on which type of germplasm.

==== Semen ====
Freezing semen is a commonly used technique in the modern animal agriculture industry, which is well researched with established methods Semen is often collected using an artificial vagina, electroejaculation, gloved-hand technique, abdominal stroking, or epididymal sperm collection. Preferred collection techniques vary based on species and available tools. Patience and technique are keys to successful collection of semen. There are several styles and types of artificial vaginas that can be used depending on the breed and species of the male. During this process the penis enters a tube that is the approximate pressure and temperature of the female's vagina. There is a disposable bag inside the tube that collects the semen. During this process it may be beneficial to have a teaser animal—an animal used to sexually tease but not impregnate the animal—to increase the arousal of the male. Electroejaculation is a method of semen collection in the cattle industry because it yields high quality semen. However, this process requires the animal to be trained and securely held, thus it is not ideal when working with wild or feral animals. When performing this process the electroejaculator is inserted into the rectum of the male. The electroejaculator stimulates the male causing an ejaculation, after which the semen is collected. The glove hand collection technique is used mainly in the swine industry. During this process, the boar mounts a dummy, while the handler grasps the penis of the boar between the ridges of his fingers and collects the semen. Abdominal stroking is exclusively used in the poultry industry. During the technique, one technician will hold the bird, while a second technician massages the bird's cloaca. However, feces and semen both exit the male bird's body through the cloaca, so the semen quality is often low.

==== Embryo ====
Embryo collection is more demanding and requires more training than semen collection because the female reproductive organs are located inside of the body cavity. Superovulation is a technique used in order to have a female release more oocytes than normal. This can be achieved by using hormones to manipulate the female's reproductive organs. The hormones used are typically gonadotropin-like, meaning they stimulate the gonads. Follicle stimulating hormone is the preferred hormone in cattle, sheep and goats. While in pigs, equine chorionic gonadotropin is preferred. However, this is not commonly done in the swine industry because gilts and sows (female pigs) naturally ovulate more than one oocyte at one time. Superovulation can be difficult because not all females will respond the same way and success will vary by species. Once the female has released the oocytes, they are fertilized internally—in vivo—and flushed out of her body. In vivo fertilization is more successful than in vitro fertilization. In cattle, usually 10 or more embryos are removed from the flushing process. In order to flush the uterus, a technician will first seal off the female's cervix and add fluid, which allows the ovum to be flushed out of the uterine horns and into a cylinder for analysis. This process typically takes 30 minutes or less. Technicians are able to determine the sex of the embryo, which can be especially beneficial in the dairy industry because it is more desirable for the embryo to be a female. Vitrification is the preferred method of embryo freezing because it yields higher quality embryos. It is crucial technicians handle the embryos with care and freeze them within 3–4 hours in order to preserve viability of the greatest percentage of embryos.

==== Oocytes ====
Oocytes can be collected from most mammalian species. Conventional oocyte collection is when ovaries are removed from a donor animal; this is done posthumously in slaughter facilities. The ovaries are kept warm as they are brought back to a laboratory for oocyte collection. Keeping the ovaries warm helps increase the success rate of fertilization. Once collected the oocytes are assessed and categorized into small, medium, and large, and then matured for 20–23 hours. This simple, inexpensive technique can lead to about 24 oocytes collected from a bovine. Conventional oocyte collection is especially useful for females who unexpectedly die or who are incapable of being bred due to injury. A second option for oocyte collection is to utilize the transvaginal ultrasound guided oocyte collection method otherwise known as TUGA. Collection technique varies slightly by species, but the general methods for collection are the same; a needle is inserted into each ovarian follicle and pulled out via vacuum. The major benefit of using this method is the ability to expand the lifetime reproductive productivity, or the number of productive days an animal is in her estrous cycle. Pregnant cows and mares continue to develop new follicles until the middle of pregnancy. Thus, TUGA can be used to substantially increase the fitness of an individual because the female then has the potential produce more than one offspring per gestation.

==== Somatic cells ====
Somatic cells are an additional resource which can be retrieved for gene banking, particularly in the cases of emergency wherein gametes cannot be collected or stored. Tissues can be taken from living animals or shortly after death. These tissues can be saved via cryopreservation or dehydrated. Blood cells can also be useful for DNA analysis such as comparing homozygosity It is recommended by the FAO that two vials of blood be drawn to reduce the chance that all samples will be lost from a particular animal. DNA can be extracted using commercial kits, making this an affordable and accessible strategy for collecting germplasms.

	Semen	Semen and Oocytes	Embryos
Number of samples needed to restore a breed	2000	100 of each	200
Backcrossing needed?	Yes	No	No
Mitochondrial genes included?	No	Yes	Yes
Collection Possible in livestock species	Mostly, not always	Yes, in some species. Operational for bovines	Yes, in some species. Operational for bovines
Cost of collection	$$	$$	$$$$
Cryopreservation possible?	Yes	Still in experimental stage	Operational in bovines, horses and sheep. Promising in pigs. Impossible in poultry
Utilization	Surgical or non-surgical insemination backcrossing for 4 generations	In vitro maturation/IVF followed by surgical or non-surgical ET	Surgical or non-surgical ET
Current feasibility	High	Medium	High depending on available resources

=== Freezing ===
There are two cryopreservation freezing methods: slow freezing and vitrification.

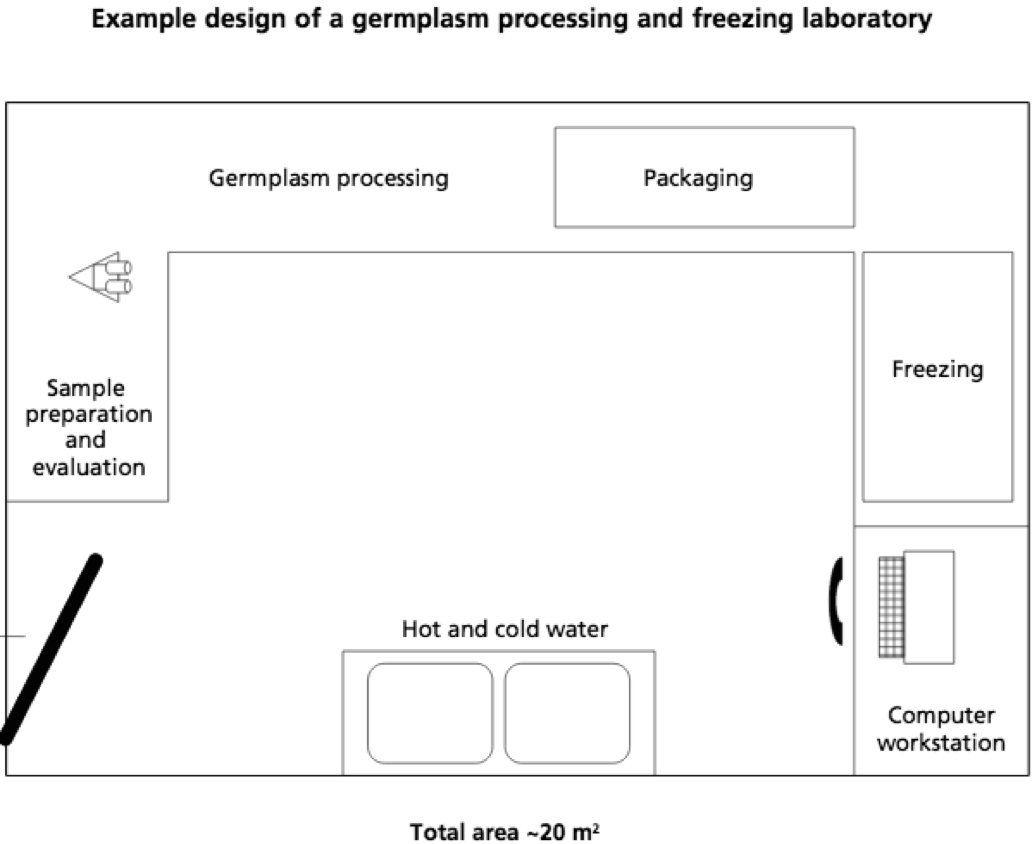
Example freezing laboratory

==== Slow freezing ====
During slow freezing, cells are placed in a medium which is cooled below the freezing point using liquid nitrogen. This causes an ice mass to form in the medium. As the water in the medium freezes, the concentration of the sugars, salts, and cryoprotectant increase. Due to osmosis, the water from the cells enters the medium to keep the concentrations of sugars, salts, and cryoprotectant equal. The water that leaves the cells is eventually frozen, causing more water to diffuse out of the cell. Eventually, the unfrozen portion—cellular—becomes too viscous for ice crystals to form inside of the cell.

==== Vitrification ====
The second technique for cryoconservation is vitrification or flash freezing. Vitrification is the transformation from a liquid to solid state without the formation of crystals. The process and mechanics of vitrification are similar to slow freezing, the difference lying in the concentration of the medium. The vitrification method applies a selected medium which has a higher concentration of solute so the water will leave the cells via osmosis. The medium is concentrated enough so all of the intracellular water will leave without the medium needing to be reconcentrated. The higher concentration of the medium in vitrification allows the germplasms to be frozen more rapidly than with slow freezing. Vitrification is considered to be the more effective technique of freezing germplasms.

== Facility design and equipment ==
=== Facility design ===
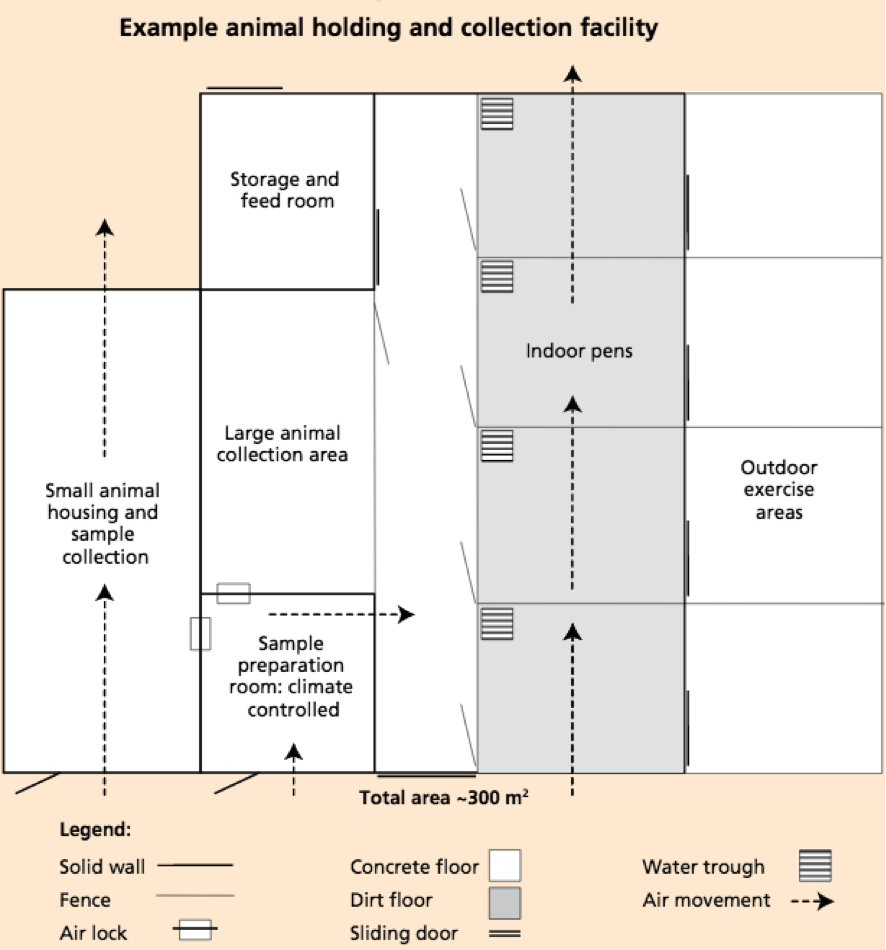
Example of animal holding and collecting facility

When designing a facility, there are several things that should be kept in mind including biosecurity, worker safety and efficiency, and animal welfare. Diverse infrastructure is required in order to successfully collect and store genetic material. The buildings needed depend on the size of facilities as well as the extent of the operations.

==== Biosecurity ====
Biosecurity, a management measure used to prevent the transmission of diseases and disease agents on the facility, is important to keep in mind when designing a facility. In order to achieve a high level of biosecurity, collection facilities should be placed as far as possible from one another, as well as from farms. According to the FAO's recommendations, facilities should be "at least 3 km from farms or other biological risks and 1 km from main roads and railways". Separation between collection facilities and surrounding farms can improve biosecurity as pests, such as flies and mice, have the potential to travel from farm to facility and vice versa. Other disease agents may be able to travel through the air via wind, furthering the importance of separation of farms and proper air sanitation and ventilation. Additionally, a perimeter fence is used to prevent potential threats that could cause contamination to germplasms, such as unauthorized personnel or unwanted animals, from entering the facilities. Animals may be housed in pens located inside or outside of a barn as long as they are contained within the perimeter fence. When interaction with outside objects, such as feed trucks or veterinary personnel, is necessary, complete sanitation is required to decrease the risk of contamination. There is always the possibility of disease spreading among the animals whose biological data is being collected or from animal to human. An example of a disease that can easily spread through germplasm is Porcine Reproductive and Respiratory Syndrome, otherwise known as PRRS. A highly contagious disease between swine, PRRS causes millions of dollars to be lost annually by producers. The disease can be spread through boar semen. Therefore, biosecurity is particularly important when genetic material will be inserted into another animal to prevent the spread of such diseases.

==== Human considerations ====
Worker safety is always a priority when handling livestock. Escape routes and alternative access throughout the facility are crucial for both the handlers and livestock. Germplasm storage and collection sites must include locker rooms for staff, which provide lockers, showers, and storage of clothing and footwear, in order to meet sanitation requirements.

==== Animal considerations ====
Animal housing practical when collecting germplasms because they keep donor animals in an easily accessible area, making the process of collecting germplasms easier and more efficient. The species and breeds of animals housed should be considered while planning the facility; facilities should be big enough to meet animal welfare standards, yet small enough to reduce human contact and increase ease of handling while reducing stress of the animal. As the process of collecting germplasm may take several days, the animal may become stressed causing a lower quality of genetic material to be obtained. Thus, training the animal to become familiar with the process is key. Holding facilities for animals may also serve as a quarantine. Quarantine facilities are necessary in order to prevent the transmission of disease from animal to animal, animal to germplasm, germplasm to germplasm, and germplasm to animal. Introducing quarantine to separate the diseased animals from the healthy should be done immediately. However, a quarantine does not always prevent the spread of disease.

==== Temperature control and ventilation ====
Temperature control and ventilation should be included in the design of the holding and collection facilities to keep the animals comfortable and healthy, while limiting stress during the germplasm collection process. Ventilation serves as an effective way to keep clean airflow throughout the facilities and eliminate odors. Temperature control helps regulate the air quality and humidity level inside the barn.

==== Equipment ====
A freezing and processing laboratory for genetic materials can be on the same site as the holding and collecting facility. However, the laboratory must have higher sanitation standards. According to the FAO, a proper germplasm laboratory should include the following.

- Washable work surfaces, floors (non-slip) and walls
- Sufficient lighting and ventilation
- Hot and cold, purified water
- Electrical sockets
- Adequate storage for consumable materials.

Cryopreservation requires equipment to collect biological material and test tubes for storage. Price is highly variable based on the quality of the collection and storage materials. The life expectancy of tools should be considered when determining costs. In addition to traditional laboratory equipment, the FAO also suggests the following:

- Disposable coveralls
- Portable incubator
- Haemocytometer
- Semen straws and filling/sealing equipment
- Liquid nitrogen storage tank
- Liquid nitrogen
- Liquid nitrogen dry-shipper
- Equipment for determining sperm concentration (one or more of the following three):
- Spectrophotometer (fixed or portable)
- Makler counter chamber (or disposable counting chamber)
- Freezing equipment (manual or programmable)
- Carbon dioxide incubator (for embryos)
- Laminar flow benches (for embryos)

== Limitations ==
Cryoconservation is limited by the cells and tissues that can be frozen and successfully thawed. Cells and tissues that can be successfully frozen are limited by their surface area. To keep cells and tissues viable, they must be frozen quickly to prevent ice crystal formation. Thus, a large surface area is beneficial. Another limitation is the species being preserved. There have been difficulties using particular methods of cryoconservation with certain species. For example, artificial insemination is more difficult in sheep than cattle, goats, pigs, or horses due to posterior folds in the cervix of ovines. Cryopreservation of embryos is dependent on the species and the stage of development of the embryo. Pig embryos are the most difficult to freeze, thaw, and utilize produce live offspring due to their sensitivity to chilling and high lipid content.

== Legal issues ==
The collection and utilization of genetic materials requires clear agreements between stakeholders with regards to their rights and responsibilities. The FAO and others, such as Mendelsohn, suggests that governments establish policies with regards to livestock genetic resources and their collection, storage, distribution, and utilization are governments. The FAO also recommends that national or regional livestock industries establish an advisory committee to advise and provide recommendations on policy. Livestock are traditionally a private good; in order to obtain ownership of genetic materials, gene banks have several strategies that they can deploy. Gene banks may either:

- buy the livestock in order to obtain and preserve genetic information
- have the germplasm donated by livestock owner
- pay a fee to the livestock owner for germplasm rights
- develop a contract with the livestock owner in order to obtain germplasm ownership only after set period of time, in order to prevent immediate acquisition of germplasm by competitors

One of the key elements of cryoconservation of livestock is open access to genetic materials, to make the resources of these conserved genetic materials accessible for utilization. Utilization should be based on sustainable use, development, and conservation, as well as improvement for the livestock industry. Government and non-governmental organizations recommend that genetic information should have open access for the following purposes:

- national public need
- non-research breeding by non-governmental organizations or private entities
- research for breed improvement, conservation of endangered breeds, and potential recovery of extinct breeds

== Examples ==
=== Hungarian Grey cattle ===
An example of the use of cryoconservation to prevent the extinction of a livestock breed is the case of the Hungarian Grey cattle, or Magyar Szürke. Hungarian Grey cattle were once a dominant breed in southeastern Europe with a population of 4.9 million head in 1884. They were mainly used for draft power and meat. However, the population had decreased to 280,000 head by the end of World War II and eventually reached the low population of 187 females and 6 males from 1965 to 1970. The breed's decreased use was due primarily to the mechanization of agriculture and the adoption of major breeds, which yield higher milk production. The Hungarian government launched a project to preserve the breed, as it possesses valuable traits, such as stamina, calving ease, disease resistance, and easy adaptation to a variety of climates. The government program included various conservation strategies, including the cryopreservation of semen and embryos. The Hungarian government's conservation effort brought the population up to 10,310 in 2012, which shows significant improvement using cryoconservation.

=== The Gaur ===
Gaur, also known as the Indian bison, is the heaviest and most powerful of all wild cattle native to South and Southeast Asia. It is indicated in field data that the population of mature animals is about 5,200–18,000. Male and female gaur both have distinctive humps between the head and shoulders, a dorsal ridge, prominent horns, and a dewlap which extends to the front legs. The gaur grows 60% faster than domestic cattle, meaning farmers meat can be harvested at a faster rate, making beef production two to three times more profitable. Gaur meat is preferred over other breeds' meat among local people. Another benefit of the bovine is that it has the ability to sweat and tolerates heat well.

The gaur population experienced a drastic decline of about 90% between the 1960s and 1990s due to poaching, commercial hunting, shrinking habitat, and the spreading of disease. According to the International Union for Conservation of Nature's Red List, the gaur is a vulnerable species due to its declining population in Southeast Asia. Although the global gaur population has declined by 30% over the past 30 years, the gaur has a relatively stable population in India, due to protective efforts such as cryoconservation. The American Association of Zoos and Aquariums, Integrated Conservation Research (ICR), and Advanced Cell Technology have made efforts to use cryopreserved specimens of the gaur through artificial insemination, embryo transfer, and cloning, respectively. Hybridization with domestic cattle has been successfully achieved by ICR, in order to create higher yielding, heat resistant cattle.

=== Mice ===
Cryopreservation is also commonly employed in biomedical research to archive and distribute genetically engineered mice (Mus musculus). Both preimplantation embryos at various stages and sperm can be used for this purpose. For distribution, cryopreserved samples are typically transported using dry shipper. Among the two methods, sperm cryopreservation offers clear advantages—it is more cost-effective and requires fewer experimental animals than embryo cryopreservation.

== See also ==
- Frozen zoo
