= Institute for Tropical Medicine Tübingen =

German research institute

The Institute for Tropical Medicine, Travel Medicine, and Human Parasitology (Institut für Tropenmedizin, Reisemedizin, Humanparasitolgie, (ITM)) specializes in infectious diseases, tropical diseases and human parasitosis. With a staff of about 100, it operates a tropical medicine and travel medicine outpatient clinic, as well as teaching and research projects in tropical medicine.

== History ==
Tropical diseases were studied in Tübingen as early as the 19th century. Notable early scientists include F. G. Gmelin (1782-1848), Wilhelm von Rapp (1774-1868) and Wilhelm Griesinger (1817-1868). Theodor Bilharz (first description 1851 of Schistosoma in Egypt) and O. E. H. Wucherer (first description 1868 of a microfilaria) have studied here. On 2 July 1917, Gottlieb Olpp was appointed to the position of an associate professor of tropical medicine at the University of Tübingen establishing the first academic position of this kind at the university. The Institute for Tropical Medicine was founded in 1956. In 2006, it was formally integrated into the Medical Clinic of the University Hospital of Tübingen.

== Research ==
Scientific studies on infectious diseases such as malaria, schistosomiasis, tuberculosis, filariasis, as well as clinical drug and vaccine studies are conducted at the institute. The major focus of research projects is the testing of new malarial drugs and vaccines with controlled plasmodial infections in healthy volunteers or African malaria patients. The institute's achievements include contributions to the development of malaria drugs, such as atovaquone-proguanil, amodiaquine artesunate, pyronaridine artesunate as well as malaria and ebola vaccines. According to a survey of the Laborjournals, 11 scientists from the Institute are among the 50 most cited scientists in the field of parasitology in the German-speaking world; in the international context, Peter G. Kremsner has been the most cited scientist of Germany in this field for two decades.

== Teaching ==
A total of three W3 professorships are currently established at the institute (Peter G. Kremsner appointed 1996, Akim Ayola Adegnika appointed 2016, Benjamin Mordmüller appointed 2017). The target group for teaching activities are students of medicine and biology. Approximately 25 different courses including lectures, seminars, colloquia, internships and courses for beginners, advanced and post-graduates are offered on a semesterly basis.

== Directors ==
- 1956–1966: Ludolph Fischer
- 1966–1979: Hermann Knüttgen
- 1979–1990: Wolfram Höfler
- 1990–2008: Jürgen Knobloch
- since 2008: Peter G. Kremsner

== PREVENT-nCoV consortium ==
The Institute for Tropical Medicine Tübingen is part of the PREVENT-nCoV consortium comprising ExpreS2ion Biotechnologies, AdaptVac (a joint-venture between ExpreS2ion Biotechnologies and the University of Copenhagen spin-out NextGen Vaccines), Leiden University Medical Center, The Department of Immunology and Microbiology (ISIM) at the University of Copenhagen, and the Laboratory of Virology at Wageningen University and Research. In March 2020 the consortium was awarded an EU Horizon 2020 grant of €2.7million for the development of a COVID-19 vaccine candidate.

== Other ==
The Institute for Tropical Medicine is part of the Comprehensive Infectious Disease Center (CIDiC) at the University Hospital Tübingen and a site of the German Center for Infection Research (DZIF). In 2007, the institute was appointed "Competence Center for Tropical Medicine in Baden-Württemberg" under the leadership of Carsten Köhler. The partner institutions of the Institute of Tropical Medicine are located at the Albert Schweitzer Hospital in Lambaréné / Gabon, Brazzaville / Congo, Hanoi / Vietnam, Cotonou / Benin and Sokodé / Togo.
