= Sanaria =

American biotechnology company

Sanaria Inc.
- Type: Corporation
- Industry: Biotechnology
- Founded: 2003
- Founder: Stephen L. Hoffman
- Headquarters: Rockville, Maryland, United States
- Products: Malaria Vaccines
- Number of employees: 55
- Website: www.sanaria.com

Sanaria is a biotechnology company founded to develop whole-parasite vaccines protective against malaria. Sanaria is also developing monoclonal antibodies protective against malaria, vaccines against diarrheal diseases, immunotherapeutics for disease of the liver, and related products for us in malaria research. Sanaria's vaccines are based on the use of the sporozoite (SPZ) stage of the malaria parasite, Plasmodium, as an immunogen, and as a carrier for immunomodulatory molecules.

== Mission statement ==
Sanaria's primary mission is to develop and commercialize whole-parasite PfSPZ vaccines that confer high-level, long-lasting protection against Plasmodium falciparum, the malaria parasite responsible for more than 95% of malaria-associated severe illness and death worldwide and the malaria parasite for which there is the most significant drug resistance. The long-term goal is to develop vaccines that prevent all human malaria and use these vaccines to immunize entire populations in geographically defined areas to halt malaria transmission and eliminate malaria. This will be accomplished by first introducing vaccines to prevent malaria in specific populations like pregnant women and children in malaria endemic areas, as well as travelers to malaria endemic areas.

== History ==
Sanaria moved into its first facility in Rockville, MD in July 2003 supported by a phase I Small Business Innovation Research (SBIR) grant from the National Institute of Allergy and Infectious Diseases (NIAID) of the National Institutes of Health (NIH) and subsequently by a $4.09M grant from the United States Army Medical Research Acquisition Activity Group to further develop its vaccine. In 2007, Sanaria received a $29.3-million grant from the Bill and Melinda Gates Foundation (BMGF), administered through the PATH Malaria Vaccine Initiative (MVI) which supported the construction of Sanaria's manufacturing facility in Rockville, MD. In 2009, Sanaria received approval from the FDA to test PfSPZ Vaccine in human trials. Sanaria® PfSPZ Vaccine is highly protective against Pf malaria transmitted by controlled human malaria infection (CHMI) and naturally transmitted Pf malaria in Africa for ywo years without intervening booster doses, including during pregnancy. PfSPZ Vaccine received FDA Fast Track Designation in 2016. Sanaria's second generation vaccine, PfSPZ-CVac (CQ) has shown stronger protection against CHMI at a 4-5-fold lower dose. Recently developed Sanaria® PfSPZ-LARC2 Vaccine is planned to be assessed in clinical trials in late 2024 and 2025 in the US, Germany, and Burkina Faso. It is expected to have the safety profile of PfSPZ Vaccine and as good, if not better, potency/efficacy, as PfSPZ-CVac.

== Clinical trials ==
Twenty-two clinical trials of PfSPZ Vaccine(radiation-attenuated SPZ) have been completed or are being conducted in the US, the Netherlands, Germany, Tanzania, Kenya, Mali, Burkina Faso, Gabon, Equatorial Guinea, and Indonesia. Recent results from a study in women of child-bearing potential in Mali showed significant vaccine efficacy (VE) against both malaria infection and clinical malaria over 18 months ranging from 41 to 86% without intervening booster doses. Many of the women participating in the trial became pregnant during follow-up post immunization, and VE during pregnancy against malaria infection was 57% during the two years of follow up. This is the first demonstration of protection against pregnancy malaria by a malaria vaccine. PfSPZ Vaccine is also very safe and well tolerated. In a meta-analysis of safety in 13 randomized, double-blind, placebo-controlled trials, the adverse event profile was no different from that of the normal saline placebo. Based on these results, a new clinical trial will be initiated in 2025 in pregnant Malian women who will be immunized in the second or third trimesters to see if PfSPZ Vaccine is safe during pregnancy and if it will reduce the maternal and fetal morbidity and mortality associated with pregnancy malaria. This study will be conducted by the Malaria Research and Training Center, University of Bamako, and the Laboratory of Malaria Immunology and Vaccinology, NIAID, with Sanaria sponsorship.

Eleven clinical trials of PfSPZ-CVac (chemo-attenuated SPZ) have been conducted in the Netherlands, the US, Germany, Equatorial Guinea, Mali, and Indonesia. In a 2021 article in Nature, two Phase I clinical trials of PfSPZ-CVac were highlighted for efficacy against a malaria parasite, highly variant from the strain in the vaccine, including 100% protection against CHMI at three months after immunization, marking the best protection achieved by a malaria vaccine.

Sanaria is now preparing for first-in-human clinical trials of PfSPZ-LARC2 Vaccine, a genetically attenuated, late-arresting, replication-competent parasite with 2 gene deletions, that should equal or exceed PfSPZ-CVac in potency while having the same safety profile as PfSPZ Vaccine. This new generation parasite is being developed in collaboration with the Seattle Children's Research Institute. It builds on earlier experience with Sanaria’s first genetically altered parasite, Sanaria^{®} PfSPZ-GA1, with a single gene deletion, which was developed in collaboration with the Leiden University Medical Center, and assessed in a clinical trial in the Netherlands. While PfSPZ-GA1 vaccine was safe, it did not offer any advantages over PfSPZ Vaccine (both parasites arrest development early in the liver stages), and is not being pursued further. PfSPZ-LARC2 Vaccine will be assessed in three trials in 2024-25, in Seattle, Washington, in Tübingen, Germany and in Burkina Faso.

Sanaria’s non-attenuated infectious sporozoites, called Sanaria PfSPZ Challenge, is a very important research tool throughout the world. This is the immunogen used in PfSPZ-CVac and can also be used to infect research participants with P. falciparum malaria in order to test the efficacy of vaccines and drugs in a controlled fashion (CHMI), as well as the impact of innate and acquired immunity and genetic background on malaria. The fully infectious sporozoites of PfSPZ Challenge have enabled research teams worldwide to conduct CHMI studies, including in the US, the Netherlands, Germany, United Kingdom, Spain, Tanzania, Kenya, Mali, Gabon, Equatorial Guinea, and the Gambia. In Kenya, 10 PhD students have used data from studies with Sanaria® PfSPZ Challenge to support their PhD thesis work. Sanaria has two variants of PfSPZ Challenge, one from West Africa and one from Brazil, and plans to develop additional variants in the coming years.

== I-PfSPZ-C ==
Sanaria's research and development is conducted with the collaboration of the International PfSPZ Consortium (I-PfSPZ-C), a group of ~290 investigators and funders from 86 organizations in 28 countries who are dedicated to development of whole PfSPZ malaria vaccines that can be used to prevent malaria in individuals and systematically eliminate malaria from geographically defined areas of the world. The I-PfSPZ-C meets 1-2 times each year to present data, discuss ideas, and map out plans for future studies in an open forum.

== Funding ==
In addition to U.S. NIAID, U.S. DoD, and the BMGF, significant funding for development of PfSPZ vaccines has come from the Government of Equatorial Guinea and the corporate social responsibility arms of three U.S. energy companies (Marathon Oil, Noble Energy and AMPCO), Top Institute Pharma (the Netherlands), universities in Nijmegen and Leiden, the Netherlands, the University of Tübingen, the German Centre for Infection Research (DZIF), the Swiss Tropical Public Health Institute and the Swiss Government, and the Tanzanian Commission on Science and Technology.

In 2020, Sanaria Inc. received €12.9M from the European Union Malaria Fund (EUMF) for the development of two malaria vaccines, one malaria prophylactic, and a SARS-CoV-2 vaccine.
