= ExpreS2ion Biotechnologies =

Danish biotechnology company

ExpreS2ion Biotechnologies ApS
- Traded as: Nasdaq First North: EXPRS2
- Industry: Biotechnology
- Founded: 2010
- Headquarters: Hørsholm, Denmark
- Key people: Martin Roland Jensen (Chairman); Bent U. Frandsen (CEO)
- Products: Vaccines and immunotherapy products
- Parent: ExpreS2ion Biotech Holding AB
- Website: www.expres2ionbio.com

ExpreS2ion Biotechnologies is a Danish biotechnology company specialised in the development of new vaccines and immunotherapy products based in Hørsholm, Denmark and listed on the Nasdaq First North Growth Market Sweden.

ExpreS2ion is part of the PREVENT-nCoV consortium comprising AdaptVac (a joint-venture between ExpreS2ion Biotechnologies and the University of Copenhagen spin-out NextGen Vaccines), Leiden University Medical Center, Institute for Tropical Medicine Tübingen, the Department of Immunology and Microbiology (ISIM) at the University of Copenhagen, and the Laboratory of Virology at Wageningen University and Research. In March 2020 the consortium was awarded an EU Horizon 2020 grant of €2.7million for the development of a COVID-19 vaccine candidate, of which ExpreS2ion was funded with €0.88million.
