= Stoned Fox =

Internet meme

Photograph of the "stoned fox" taxidermy

Stoned Fox or Bad Taxidermy Fox is an anthropomorphic taxidermied fox that has become an Internet sensation in Russia.

In 2012, Welsh artist Adele Morse stuffed a fox, which had died of natural causes, as part of a Masters course at the Royal Academy of London. She put the finished work on eBay, and it unexpectedly became an Internet meme in Russia.

It has since been edited into famous paintings, photographs, videos, and other visual media.

== See also ==
- Lion of Gripsholm Castle
- Homunculus loxodontus
