= PfSPZ Vaccine =

Malaria vaccine

PfSPZ Vaccine is a metabolically active non-replicating whole sporozoite (SPZ) malaria vaccine being developed by Sanaria against Plasmodium falciparum (Pf) malaria. Clinical trials have been safe, extremely well tolerated and highly efficacious. The first generation PfSPZ product is attenuated by gamma irradiation; the second generation vaccines PfSPZ-CVac and PfSPZ LARC2 are, respectively, attenuated chemically and genetically. Multiple studies are ongoing with trials of the PfSPZ vaccines. All three products are produced using the same manufacturing process. These products are stored and distributed below -150 °C using liquid nitrogen (LN2) vapor phase (LNVP) freezers and cryoshippers.

== History ==
In the first half of the 20th century there were first attempts to protect people from malaria. At the beginning Pasteur's approach of developing bacterial vaccines was used as a big hope in eradication of this fatal disease. But inactivated malaria sporozoites were ineffective in inducing the protection. In 1948 inactivated merozoites with an adjuvant were used for preventing lethal malaria to kill a group of monkeys. But the strong toxicity of the adjuvant and inability to obtain sufficient count of parasites from human blood stopped further efforts in this way.

In 1967 irradiated malaria sporozoites (extracted from salivary glands of infected mosquitos) induced immune response in mice without the need of the adjuvant and similar evidence obtained in human volunteer trials. The mice were exposed to irradiated mosquitos infected by malaria parasites. Mice and volunteers did not acquire malaria because mosquitos and the sporozoites were irradiated and their immune cells triggered response that could protect them from following infection. Yet this approach was not further developed due to problems with obtaining sufficient number of sporozoites and with the harvesting of parasites.

Later, modern adjuvants and the possibility of preparing of single parasite proteins provided another way to create a malaria vaccine. RTS,S is a subunit vaccine based on coat protein of sporozoites of the Plasmodium falciparum. The RTS,S vaccine was endorsed by the World Health Organization in October 2021 for broad use in children, making it the first malaria vaccine to receive this recommendation. As of April 2022, 1 million children in Ghana, Kenya and Malawi have received at least one shot of the vaccine, with more doses being provided as the vaccine production ramps up. RTS,S reduces hospital admissions from severe malaria by around 30%.

== PfSPZ development ==
In 2003 Sanaria ran trials in which falciparum sporozoites were manually dissected from salivary glands of mosquitos, irradiated and preserved before inoculation with one goal: to develop and commercialize a non-replicating, metabolically active PfSPZ vaccine.

In human volunteer trials PfSPZ was applied subcutaneously (SC) or intradermally (ID) and such as it showed only modest immune response. When PfSPZ Vaccine was injected intravenously (IV) to nonhuman primates or mice it finally triggers CD8+ T-cells producing IFNγ. These T cells are believed to be the main immunologic mechanism to fight malaria in liver.

Two first clinical trials of IV administration of PfSPZ were conducted in 2013. Previous ID or IC clinical trials didn't trigger adequate immune response. A 2014 phase 1 trial with the PfSPZ Vaccine found that more than half of the participants were protected from malaria infection for over a year after the trial.

In 2014 Sanaria promoted an Indiegogo campaign to develop a robot that could dissect salivary glands of mosquitos, to make preparation and further development of vaccine much faster and easier. The crowdfunding campaign ended, after being backed by $45,024 of the $250,000 goal.

The PfSPZ Vaccine candidate was granted fast track designation by the U.S. Food and Drug Administration in September 2016.

A study published in 2017 reported complete protection after 10 weeks with three doses of PfSPZ-CVac. In April 2019, a phase 3 trial in Bioko was announced, scheduled to start in early 2020. Another study of the PfSPZ vaccine was published in December 2022, reporting vaccine efficacy at up to 48% at 6 months follow up, and up to 46% efficacy at 18 months.

Recent field studies have evaluated PfSPZ Vaccine in malaria-experienced African adults. A randomized, double-blind, placebo-controlled trial in Burkina Faso tested a three-dose intravenous regimen and reported vaccine efficacy of up to 48% at 6 months and 46% at 18 months against naturally acquired Plasmodium falciparum infection. The vaccine was well tolerated and immunogenic in this population.

Additional studies in Equatorial Guinea examined multi-dose priming regimens of PfSPZ Vaccine followed by controlled human malaria infection (CHMI). Several schedules were found to be safe and capable of inducing significant protection against homologous challenge. By 2022 more than twenty clinical trials of PfSPZ-based products had been completed or were ongoing across Africa, Europe and the United States.

PfSPZ Vaccine has also been evaluated in women of childbearing age and in participants who later became pregnant. Two randomized, double-blind, placebo-controlled trials in Mali investigated vaccination following presumptive antimalarial treatment. Across two transmission seasons, vaccine efficacy against Plasmodium falciparum parasitaemia in women of childbearing age ranged from 41% to 61%, depending on dose and year of follow-up.

Among participants who conceived after vaccination, the vaccine was safe for mothers and infants and reduced the incidence of malaria parasitaemia during pregnancy. Women who became pregnant within approximately six months of the final dose showed vaccine efficacy estimates between 57% and 86% against parasitaemia in pregnancy.

Because malaria and HIV infections frequently overlap geographically, PfSPZ Vaccine has been studied in HIV-positive adults. A randomized, double-blind, placebo-controlled trial in Tanzania administered five intravenous doses to HIV-negative and well-controlled HIV-positive participants. The vaccine was safe in both groups, but protection against CHMI was observed only in HIV-negative individuals, with an estimated vaccine efficacy of 80% in HIV-negative adults and no measurable efficacy in the HIV-positive cohort.

Serological profiling indicated that HIV infection did not markedly diminish the magnitude of antibody responses to key sporozoite antigens, although cellular correlates of protection appear impaired in HIV-positive individuals.

Recent analyses have examined the immune targets associated with PfSPZ-induced protection. Whole-proteome antibody profiling in Tanzanian trial participants revealed that vaccination elicits a focused IgG and IgM response to a limited set of Plasmodium falciparum antigens, including circumsporozoite protein and several liver- and blood-stage proteins.

A whole-genome sieve analysis of parasites obtained from vaccinated and placebo recipients in West African field trials identified distinct parasite polymorphisms associated with vaccine breakthrough infections. These findings suggest specific parasite loci may be under vaccine-induced immune pressure and highlight potential targets for future optimization of whole-sporozoite vaccines.

PfSPZ Vaccine development has been closely linked with malaria elimination efforts on Bioko Island, Equatorial Guinea. By 2024–2025, a series of registry studies, incidence surveys and dose-optimization trials had been completed as part of preparations for a large-scale, Africa-led phase 3 efficacy trial. These activities were coordinated through the Equatoguinean Malaria Vaccine Initiative, which aims to evaluate PfSPZ Vaccine in a setting with intense seasonal transmission and established malaria control programs.

== Mechanism ==
CD8+ T cells play a key role in killing Plasmodium developing in the liver. Mice or monkeys which received monoclonal antibody to the CD8 lost protection by this type of vaccine. Once the antibody application was stopped, the protection was returned. Plasmodium is injected by infected mosquito into the bloodstream of the host in the form of sporozoites, which travel to the liver and invade liver cells, where sporozoites divide and produce tens of thousands merozoites per one cell. RTS,S is prepared to stop malaria in the phase after the injection. The PfSPZ vaccine is made of attenuated sporozites, which are active and travel to liver cells, where CD8+ T cells producing IFNγ are activated. Frequencies of PfSPZ-specific CD3+CD4+, CD3+CD8+, CD3+γδ T cells are dose-dependent. PfSPZ-specific CD3+CD8+ T cells were found in 7 of 12 protected subjects in a human volunteer trial. These cells are required for protection in most individuals and are primarily situated in the liver because of the persistence of parasite antigens and retained as tissue memory cells.

== Distribution ==
PfSPZ vaccines are cryopreserved and stored in LNVP freezers below -150 °C and distributed using dry vapor cryoshippers that also maintain temperature below -150 °C. Cryoshippers are self-contained mobile storage units that have hold times of ~14 to 28 days or more depending on model and packaging and are highly suited for last-mile transportation, particularly in Africa. Cryoshippers are used extensively in the livestock breeding, CAR-T and cellular therapies industries. LNVP distribution uses a simple hub-and-spoke model and cryoshippers stay at the immunization sites as temporary storage units that may be recharged with LN2. Advantages of the LNVP cold chain are a) independence from electricity, b) no requirement for fridges, freezers or refrigerated transport, c) no narrow temperature requirements, d) reduced chances for temperature deviations, e) no moving parts, and f) energy efficiency. LN2 is widely available, including in African countries, making LNVP distribution easier than the 2-8 °C and the dry ice and ultralow freezer-based cold chains of Ervebo (vs ebola) and certain SARS-CoV-2 vaccines. Modeling LNVP distribution also indicated costs would be no different per 3-dose regimen than the 2-8 °C cold chain for lyophilized vaccines.
