= Vulnerable species =

IUCN conservation category

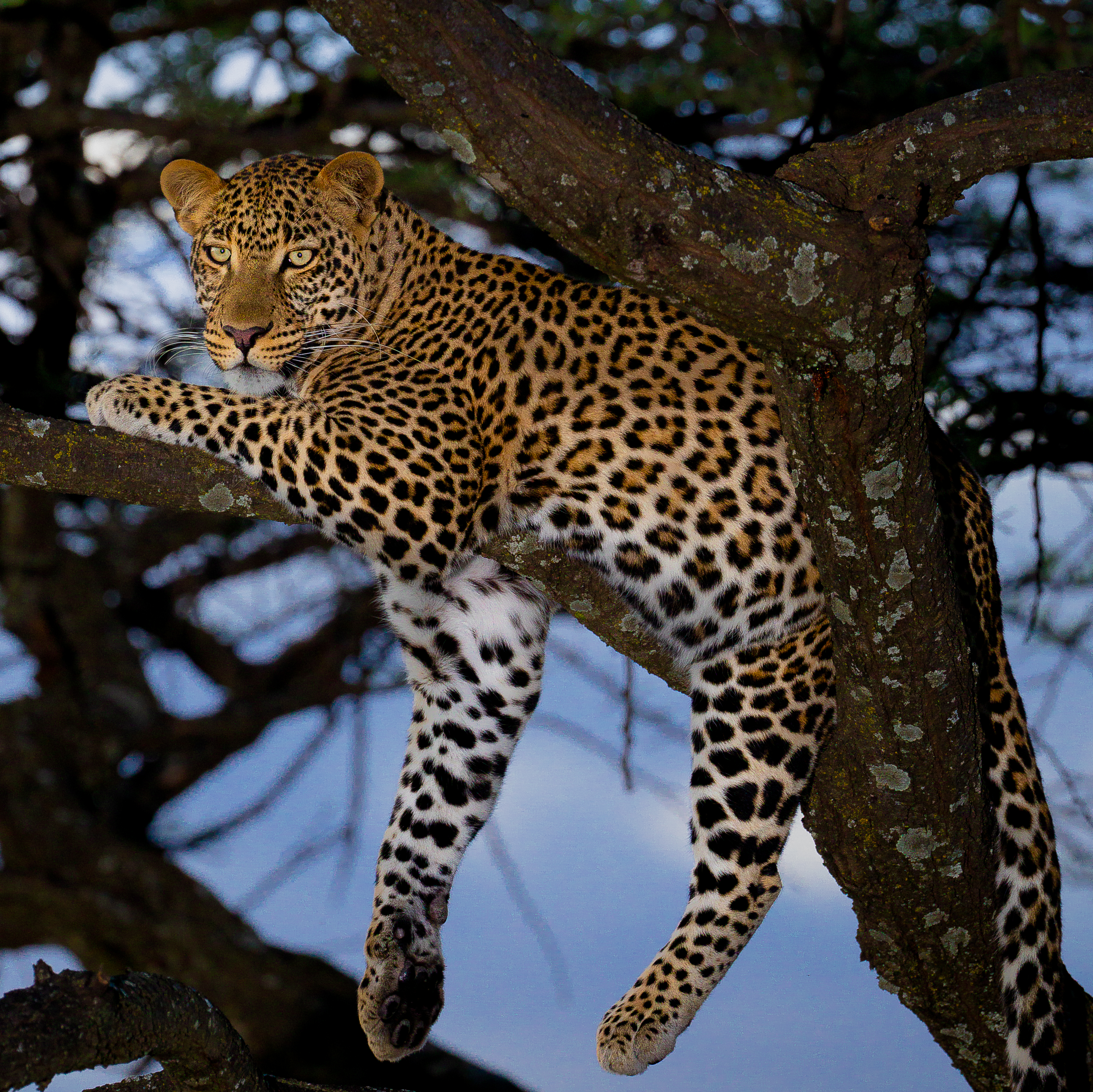
The African leopard is classed as a vulnerable species.

A vulnerable species is a species that has been categorized by the International Union for Conservation of Nature as being threatened with extinction unless the circumstances that are threatening its survival and reproduction improve.

Vulnerability is mainly caused by habitat loss or destruction of the species' home. Vulnerable habitat or species are monitored and can become increasingly threatened. Some species listed as "vulnerable" may be common in captivity, an example being the military macaw.

In 2012, a total of 5,196 animals and 6,789 plants were classified as vulnerable, compared with values of 2,815 and 3,222 in 1998, corresponding to increases of 85 percent and 111 percent, respectively, over a 14 year period, or about 4 percent and 5 percent a year.

Practices such as cryoconservation of animal genetic resources have been enforced in efforts to conserve vulnerable breeds of livestock specifically.

Some examples of vulnerable animal species are the hyacinth macaw, the mountain zebra, the gaur, the black crowned crane, and the blue crane.

== Criteria ==
The International Union for Conservation of Nature uses several criteria to enter species in this category. A taxon is Vulnerable when it is not critically endangered or Endangered but is facing a high risk of extinction in the wild in the medium-term future, as defined by any of the following criteria (A to E):

A) Population reduction in the form of either of the following:

1. An observed, estimated, inferred or suspected population size reduction of ≥ 50% over the last 10 years or three generations, whichever is the longer, provided the causes of the reduction are clearly reversible AND understood AND ceased. This measurement is based on (and specifying) any of the following:
  1. direct observation
  2. an index of abundance appropriate for the taxon
  3. a decline in area of occupancy, extent of occurrence or quality of habitat
  4. actual or potential levels of exploitation
  5. the effects of introduced taxa, hybridisation, pathogens, pollutants, competitors or parasites.
2. A reduction of at least 30%, projected or suspected to be met within the next ten years or three generations, whichever is the longer, based on (and specifying) any of (2), (3), (4) or (5) above.

B) Extent of occurrence estimated to be less than 20,000 km^{2} or area of occupancy estimated to be less than 2,000 km^{2}, and estimates indicating any two of the following:

1. Severely fragmented or known to exist at no more than ten locations.
2. Continuing decline, inferred, observed or projected, in any of the following criteria:
  1. extent of occurrence
  2. area of occupancy
  3. area, extent or quality of habitat
  4. number of locations or subpopulations
  5. number of mature individuals
1. Extreme fluctuations in any of the above five criteria.

C) Population estimated to number fewer than 10,000 mature individuals and either:

1. An estimated continuing decline of at least 10% within 10 years or three generations, whichever is longer, or
2. A continuing decline, observed, projected, or inferred, in numbers of mature individuals and population structure in the form of either:
  1. severely fragmented (i.e. no subpopulation estimated to contain more than 1,000 mature individuals)
  2. all mature individuals are in a single subpopulation

D) Population very small or restricted in the form of either of the following:

1. Population estimated to number less than 1,000 mature individuals.
2. Population is characterised by an acute restriction in its area of occupancy (typically less than 20 km^{2}) or in the number of locations (typically less than five). Such a taxon would thus be prone to the effects of human activities (or stochastic events whose impact is increased by human activities) within a very short period of time in an unforeseeable future, and is thus capable of becoming Critically Endangered or even Extinct in a very short period.

E) Quantitative analysis showing the probability of extinction in the wild is at least 10% within 100 years.

== See also ==
- Category:IUCN Red List vulnerable species for an alphabetical list
- Cryoconservation of animal genetic resources
- List of IUCN Red List vulnerable plants
- List of vulnerable amphibians
- List of vulnerable arthropods
- List of vulnerable birds
- List of vulnerable fishes
- List of vulnerable insects
- List of vulnerable invertebrates
- List of vulnerable mammals
- List of vulnerable molluscs
- List of vulnerable reptiles
