= Stephen L. Hoffman =

American physician-scientist

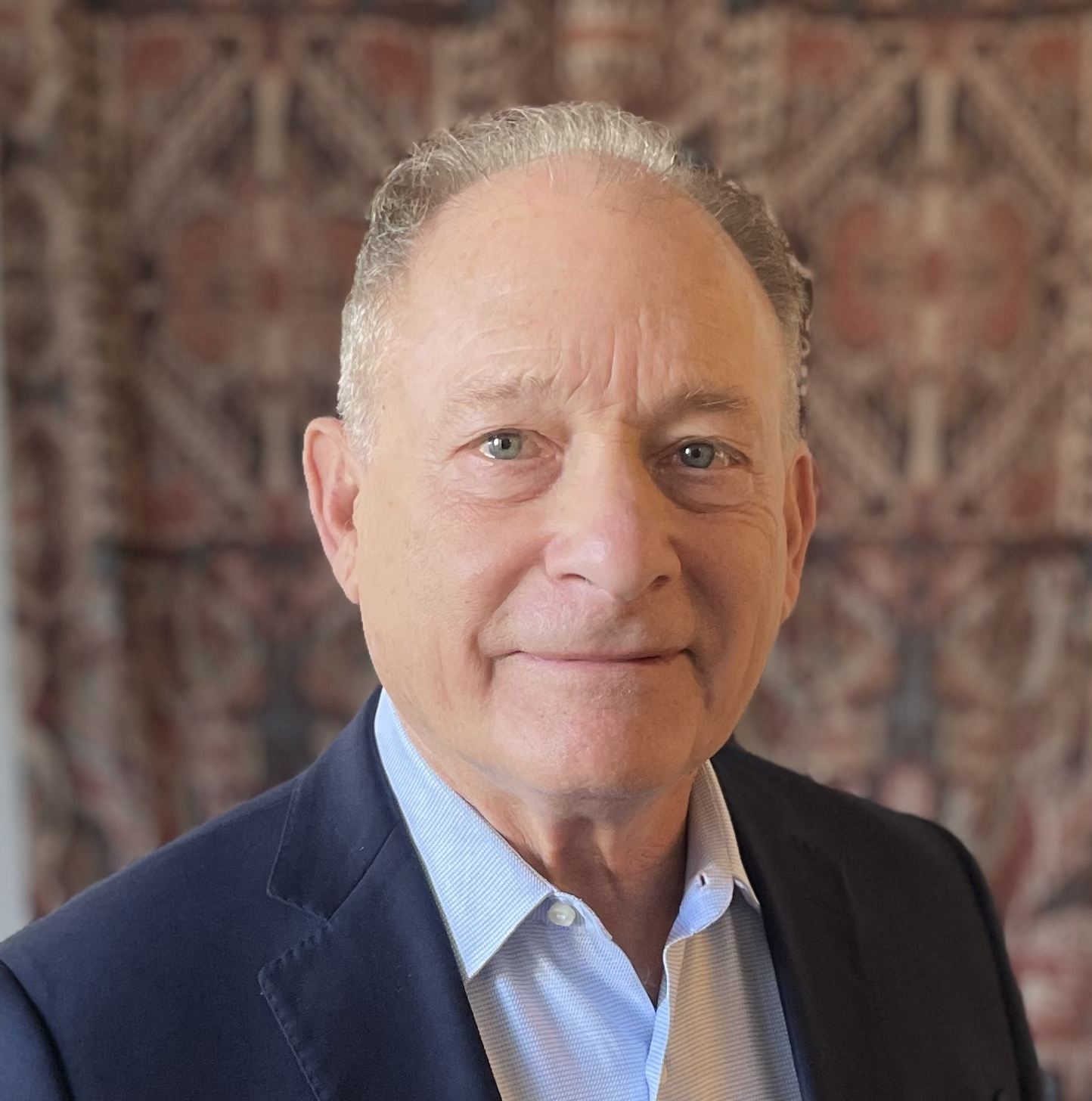
- Dr. Hoffman in 2024
- Born: Stephen L. Hoffman; July 31, 1948 (age 78); Belmar, New Jersey, U.S.
- Scientific career
- Education: University of Pennsylvania (BA); Weill Cornell Medical College (MD); London School of Hygiene & Tropical Medicine (DTM&H)
- Fields: Malaria, Vaccinology, Global Health
- Workplaces: University of California San Diego; Naval Medical Research Institute; Celera Genomics; Sanaria
- Military career
- Allegiance: United States
- Branch: United States Navy
- Years of service: 1980–2001
- Rank: Captain
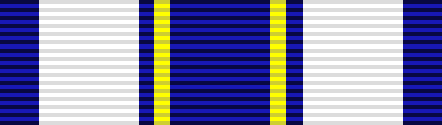
- Awards: Meritorious Service Medal; Army Achievement Medal; Legion of Merit (2); Captain Robert Dexter Conrad Award

Stephen L. Hoffman MD, DTMH, CAPT, MC, USN (RET) is the founder and CEO of Sanaria, Inc.

== Early life and education ==
Hoffman was raised initially in Belmar and subsequently in Ocean Township, Monmouth County, New Jersey. He graduated from Asbury Park High School in 1966, received a BA in political science from the University of Pennsylvania in 1970, an MD from Cornell University Medical College (now Weill Cornell Medicine) in 1975, and a Diploma in Tropical Medicine and Hygiene from the London School of Hygiene and Tropical Medicine in 1978. Additionally in 1978, he completed a residency in Family Medicine at the University of California San Diego. He is board certified in Family Medicine and received a Certificate of Knowledge in Clinical Tropical Medicine and Travelers Health in 1998, and a Doctor of Science (DSc), honoris causa from Monmouth University in 2006.

== Professional career ==
=== Work experience ===
After completing his residency in 1978, Hoffman was co-founder and director of the Tropical Medicine and Travelers clinic at University Hospital, University of California, San Diego, an adjunct clinical faculty member, and an emergency room physician. In 1980, Hoffman was commissioned as a medical officer in the United States Navy and stationed in Jakarta, Indonesia at the Naval Medical Research Unit Two-Jakarta Detachment where he was the director of the Department of Clinical Investigation and Epidemiology through 1984. His initial focus was on treatment of severe typhoid fever. He proposed and studied the use of high dose dexamethasone in the treatment of severe typhoid fever, which reduced the typhoid fever death rate by more than 80 percent. He also conducted research throughout the Indonesian archipelago on cholera, filariasis, and malaria. In 1987, Hoffman returned to Bethesda, MD, and served as the director of the Malaria Program at the Naval Medical Research Institute (later Naval Medical Research Center) until 2001. Hoffman and his team worked on identifying the targets and mechanisms of protective immunity against malaria and malaria vaccine development. They were the first in the world to test a DNA vaccine in normal humans and demonstrate that DNA vaccines elicited killer T cell responses. Hoffman also led the team that sequenced the Plasmodium falciparum genome.

After retiring from the Navy, Hoffman spent two years as senior vice president of biologics at Celera Genomics, the company that sequenced the human genome. Hoffman worked with utilizing human genomics and proteomics to develop immunotherapies and vaccines against cancer and to establish the potential for the field of personalized medicine. He also organized the sequencing of the genome of Anopheles gambiae.

In 2003 Hoffman founded Sanaria Inc. to develop whole sporozoite malaria vaccines and has since been the chief executive and scientific officer of Sanaria Inc.

=== Contributions to science and technology ===
Hoffman has over 500 scientific publications. He has made major contributions in the following areas.

- Treatment of severe typhoid fever. He established that high dose dexamethasone treatment reduced mortality of severe typhoid fever by more than 80%.
- Understanding of pre-erythrocytic (liver) stage protective immunity against malaria. He reported the first demonstration of killing of infected hepatocytes (liver cells) by malaria sporozoite specific T cells, the first demonstration of human cytotoxic T lymphocytes against any parasite, and the complexity of protective immunity at this stage of the parasite life cycle.
- Development of DNA vaccines and prime boost approaches. He conducted the first trial of a DNA or any other nucleotide vaccine in a normal human and made the first demonstration that a DNA vaccine induced CD8+ cytotoxic T cells in humans.
- Sequencing of the genomes of Plasmodium falciparum, the parasite that causes more than 98% of deaths from malaria and Anopheles gambiae, the major malaria transmitting mosquito in Africa. He was the senior author on the papers reporting the sequences of the first Plasmodium falciparum chromosome and of Anopheles gambiae, the major mosquito vector of malaria in Africa.
- Development of whole sporozoite malaria vaccines. It has been known since the 1970s that immunization of humans by bite of mosquitoes infected with radiation attenuated P. falciparum (Pf) sporozoites (SPZ) protects these individuals. Malaria vaccine development always relied on creating subunit vaccines to try to duplicate this immunity, because it was thought to be impossible to produce a whole sporozoite vaccine that met regulatory and cost of goods standards. Hoffman conceived of the idea of developing an injectable sporozoite vaccine, and he and his team developed all the technology to manufacture whole sporozoite vaccines. Immunization with the radiation-attenuated PfSPZ Vaccine and the chemo-attenuated PfSPZ- CVac, have both been shown to induce 100% protective immunity in humans, protection that has now been shown to be durable for at least 18 months, and effective against the heterogeneous P. falciparum parasites found in high transmission areas of Mali and Burkina Faso. An international consortium has been established that has and will continue to run clinical trials at 5 sites in the U.S., Germany, 5 countries in Europe, 7 countries in Africa, and Indonesia, and is planning to submit a PfSPZ vaccine for licensure in 2028.

== Awards and distinctions ==
=== Awards ===
- 1992 Best Scientific Paper Award, Naval Medical Research Institute, Fifty Years of Scientific Excellence 1942–1992. "Protection Against Malaria by Vaccination with Sporozoite Surface Protein 2 Plus CS Protein." Science, 1991
- 1992 Bailey K. Ashford Medal from the American Society of Tropical Medicine and Hygiene for, "Outstanding contributions to the field of tropical medicine by a scientist less than 45 years of age."
- 1993 Legion of Merit Medal; United States Navy: awarded for scientific accomplishments
- 1994 The Colonel George W. Hunter III Certificate, 1994; For excellence as senior lecturer in Tropical Medicine at the Walter Reed Army Institute of Research
- 1998 The Captain Robert Dexter Conrad Award, for outstanding contributions in the field of research and development for the Department of the Navy presented by Chief of Naval Research
- 2000 2nd Legion of Merit Medal; United States Navy: awarded for scientific accomplishments and presented by the Secretary of the Navy
- 2006 Joseph Augustine Le Prince Medal, awarded by the American Society of Tropical Medicine and Hygiene, "In recognition of outstanding work in the field of malariology"
- 2007 Asbury Park High School Distinguished Alumni Hall of Fame
- 2015 Best Biotech CEO, Vaccine Industry Excellence (ViE) Awards, World Vaccine Congress
- 2015 CEO of the Year, Tech Council of Maryland
- 2016 Alumni Association Award of Distinction, Weill Cornell Medical College
- 2016 Innovator of the Year, Daily Record
- 2020 Clara Southmayd Ludlow Medal from the American Society of Tropical Medicine and Hygiene for " inspirational and pioneering spirit, whose work represents success despite obstacles and advances the field of tropical medicine"
- 2024 Walter Reed Medal from the American Society of Tropical Medicine and Hygiene for "distinguished accomplishment in the field of tropical medicine."

=== Memberships ===
- American Society of Tropical Medicine and Hygiene (member 1978, fellow 2012)
- Infectious Diseases Society of America (elected fellow 1988)
- American Society for Clinical Investigation (elected 1990)
- Association of American Physicians (elected 2003)
- National Academy of Medicine (elected 2004)
- American Academy of Microbiology (fellow 2005)
- American Association for the Advancement of Science (fellow 2008)
- American Academy of Family Physicians (member 2016)

=== Personal life ===
Hoffman is married to B. Kim Lee Sim, PhD, a molecular biologist, who was the founder and president of Protein Potential LLC and is current executive vice president of Sanaria Inc. They have three children (Alexander [JD], Seth [MD], and Benjamin [MD, PhD]).

== Selected publications ==
- Hoffman, S. L.; Punjabi, N. H.; Kumala, S.; Moechtar, M. A.; Pulungsih, S. P.; Rivai, A. R.; Rockhill, R. C.; Woodward, T. E.; Loedin, A. A. (1984-01-12). "Reduction of mortality in chloramphenicol-treated severe typhoid fever by high-dose dexamethasone". The New England Journal of Medicine. 310 (2): 82–88. doi:10.1056/NEJM198401123100203. ISSN 0028-4793. PMID 6361558.
- Hoffman, SL; Wistar, R Jr; Ballou, WR; Hollingdale, MR; Wirtz, RA; Schneider, I; Marwoto, HA; Hockmeyer, WT (1986). "Immunity to malaria and naturally acquired antibodies to the circumsporozoite protein of Plasmodium falciparum". N Engl J Med. 315 (10): 601–6. doi:10.1056/NEJM198609043151001. PMID 3526148..
- Hoffman, S. L.; Oster, C. N.; Plowe, C. V.; Woollett, G. R.; Beier, J. C.; Chulay, J. D.; Wirtz, R. A.; Hollingdale, M. R.; Mugambi, M. (1987-08-07). "Naturally acquired antibodies to sporozoites do not prevent malaria: vaccine development implications". Science. 237 (4815): 639–642. Bibcode:1987Sci...237..639H. doi:10.1126/science.3299709. ISSN 0036-8075. PMID 3299709.
- Hoffman, SL; Isenbarger, D; Long, GW; Sedegah, M; Szarfman, A; Waters, L; Hollingdale, MR; van der Meide, PH; Finbloom, DS; Ballou, WR (1989). "Sporozoite vaccine induces genetically restricted T cell elimination of malaria from hepatocytes". Science. 244 (4908): 1078–81. Bibcode:1989Sci...244.1078H. doi:10.1126/science.2524877. PMID 2524877..
- Malik, A; Egan, JE; Houghten, RA; Sadoff, JC; Hoffman, SL (Apr 1991). "Human cytotoxic T lymphocytes against the Plasmodium falciparum circumsporozoite protein". Proc Natl Acad Sci U S A. 88 (8): 3300–4. Bibcode:1991PNAS...88.3300M. doi:10.1073/pnas.88.8.3300. PMC 51434. PMID 1707538.
- Doolan, DL; Hoffman, SL (2000). "The complexity of protective immunity against liver-stage malaria". J Immunol. 165 (3): 1453–62. doi:10.4049/jimmunol.165.3.1453. PMID 10903750..
- Sedegah, M.; Hedstrom, R.; Hobart, P.; Hoffman, S. L. (1994-10-11). "Protection against malaria by immunization with plasmid DNA encoding circumsporozoite protein". Proceedings of the National Academy of Sciences of the United States of America. 91 (21): 9866–9870. Bibcode:1994PNAS...91.9866S. doi:10.1073/pnas.91.21.9866. ISSN 0027-8424. PMC 44918. PMID 7937907.
- Sedegah, M; Jones, TR; Kaur, M; Hedstrom, R; Hobart, P; Tine, JA; Hoffman, SL (Jun 1998). "Boosting with recombinant vaccinia increases immunogenicity and protective efficacy of malaria DNA vaccine". Proc Natl Acad Sci U S A. 95 (13): 7648–53. Bibcode:1998PNAS...95.7648S. doi:10.1073/pnas.95.13.7648. PMC 22711. PMID 9636204.
- Wang, R; Doolan, DL; Le, TP; Hedstrom, RC; Coonan, KM; Charoenvit, Y; Jones, TR; Hobart, P; Margalith, M; Ng, J; Weiss, WR; Sedegah, M; de Taisne, C; Norman, JA; Hoffman, SL (1998). "Induction of antigen-specific cytotoxic T lymphocytes in humans by a malaria DNA vaccine". Science. 282 (5388): 476–80. Bibcode:1998Sci...282..476W. doi:10.1126/science.282.5388.476. PMID 9774275..
- Wang, R; Epstein, J; Baraceros, FM; Gorak, EJ; Charoenvit, Y; Carucci, DJ; Hedstrom, RC; Rahardjo, N; Gay, T; Hobart, P; Stout, R; Jones, TR; Richie, TL; Parker, SE; Doolan, DL; Norman, J; Hoffman, SL (Sep 2001). "Induction of CD4(+) T cell-dependent CD8(+) type 1 responses in humans by a malaria DNA vaccine". Proc Natl Acad Sci U S A. 98 (19): 10817–22. doi:10.1073/pnas.181123498. PMC 58557. PMID 11526203.
- Gardner, MJ; Tettelin, H; Carucci, DJ; Cummings, LM; Aravind, L; Koonin, EV; Shallom, S; Mason, T; Yu, K; Fujii, C; Pederson, J; Shen, K; Jing, J; Aston, C; Lai, Z; Schwartz, DC; Pertea, M; Salzberg, S; Zhou, L; Sutton, GG; Clayton, R; White, O; Smith, HO; Fraser, CM; Adams, MD; Venter, JC; Hoffman, SL (1998). "Chromosome 2 sequence of the human malaria parasite Plasmodium falciparum". Science. 282 (5391): 1126–32. doi:10.1126/science.282.5391.1126. PMID 9804551..
- Hoffman, SL; Subramanian, GM; Collins, FH; Venter, JC (2002). "Plasmodium, human and Anopheles genomics and malaria". Nature. 415 (6872): 702–9. doi:10.1038/415702a. PMID 11832959..
- Holt, RA; Subramanian, GM; Halpern, A; et al. (October 2002). "The genome sequence of the malaria mosquito Anopheles gambiae". Science. 298 (5591): 129–49. Bibcode:2002Sci...298..129H. doi:10.1126/science.1076181. PMID 12364791..
- Hoffman, SL; Goh, LM; Luke, TC; Schneider, I; Le, TP; Doolan, DL; Sacci, J; de la Vega, P; Dowler, M; Paul, C; Gordon, DM; Stoute, JA; Church, LW; Sedegah, M; Heppner, DG; Ballou, WR; Richie, TL (2002). "Protection of humans against malaria by immunization with radiation-attenuated Plasmodium falciparum sporozoites". J Infect Dis. 185 (8): 1155–64. doi:10.1086/339409. PMID 11930326..
- Epstein JE, Tewari K, Lyke KE, Sim BK, Billingsley PF, Laurens MB, Gunasekera A, Chakravarty S, James ER, Sedegah M, Richman A, Velmurugan S, Reyes S, Li M, Tucker K, Ahumada A, Ruben AJ, Li T, Stafford R, Eappen AG, Tamminga C, Bennett JW, Ockenhouse CF, Murphy JR, Komisar J, Thomas N, Loyevsky M, Birkett A, Plowe CV, Loucq C, Edelman R, Richie TL, Seder RA, and Hoffman SL. Live attenuated malaria vaccine designed to protect through hepatic CD8 T cell immunity. Science 334: 475–480, 2011.
- Seder, RA; Chang, LJ; Enama, ME; Zephir, KL; Sarwar, UN; Gordon, IJ; Holman, LA; James, ER; Billingsley, PF; Gunasekera, A; Richman, A; Chakravarty, S; Manoj, A; Velmurugan, S; Li, M; Ruben, AJ; Li, T; Eappen, AG; Stafford, RE; Plummer, SH; Hendel, CS; Novik, L; Costner, PJ; Mendoza, FH; Saunders, JG; Nason, MC; Richardson, JH; Murphy, J; Davidson, SA; Richie, TL; Sedegah, M; Sutamihardja, A; Fahle, GA; Lyke, KE; Laurens, MB; Roederer, M; Tewari, K; Epstein, JE; Sim, BK; Ledgerwood, JE; Graham, BS; Hoffman, SL (2013). "Protection against malaria by intravenous immunization with a nonreplicating sporozoite vaccine". Science. 341 (6152): 1359–65. Bibcode:2013Sci...341.1359S. doi:10.1126/science.1241800. PMID 23929949..
- Sissoko, MS; Healy, SA; Katile, A; Omaswa, F; Zaidi, I; Gabriel, EE; Kamate, B; Samake, Y; Guindo, MA; Dolo, A; Niangaly, A; Niaré, K; Zeguime, A; Sissoko, K; Diallo, H; Thera, I; Ding, K; Fay, MP; O'Connell, EM; Nutman, TB; Wong-Madden, S; Murshedkar, T; Ruben, AJ; Li, M; Abebe, Y; Manoj, A; Gunasekera, A; Chakravarty, S; Sim, BKL; Billingsley, PF; James, ER; Walther, M; Richie, TL; Hoffman, SL; Doumbo, O; Duffy, PE (2017). "Safety and efficacy of PfSPZ Vaccine against Plasmodium falciparum via direct venous inoculation in healthy malaria-exposed adults in Mali: a randomised, double-blind phase 1 trial". Lancet Infect Dis. 17 (5): 498–509. doi:10.1016/S1473-3099(17)30104-4. PMC 6803168. PMID 28216244.
- Mordmuller B, Surat G, Lagler H, Chakravarty S, Ishizuka AS, Lalremruata A, Gmeiner M, Campo JJ, Esen M, Ruben AJ, Held J, Calle CL, Mengue JB, Gebru T, Ibanez J, Sulyok M, James ER, Billingsley PF, Natasha KC, Manoj A, Murshedkar T, Gunasekera A, Eappen AG, Li T, Stafford RE, Li M, Felgner PL, Seder RA, Richie TL, Sim BK, Hoffman SL, and Kremsner PG. Sterile protection against human malaria by chemoattenuated PfSPZ vaccine. Nature 542: 445–449, 2017.
- Sissoko, MS; Healy, SA; Katile, A; Zaidi, I; Hu, Z; Kamate, B; Samake, Y; Sissoko, K; Mwakingwe-Omari, A; Lane, J; Imeru, A; Mohan, R; Thera, I; Guindo, CO; Dolo, A; Niare, K; Koïta, F; Niangaly, A; Rausch, KM; Zeguime, A; Guindo, MA; Bah, A; Abebe, Y; James, ER; Manoj, A; Murshedkar, T; Kc, N; Sim, BKL; Billingsley, PF; Richie, TL; Hoffman, SL; Doumbo, O; Duffy, PE (2022). "Safety and efficacy of a three-dose regimen of Plasmodium falciparum sporozoite vaccine in adults during an intense malaria transmission season in Mali: a randomised, controlled phase 1 trial". Lancet Infect Dis. 22 (3): 377–389. doi:10.1016/S1473-3099(21)00332-7. PMC 8981424. PMID 34801112..
- Mwakingwe-Omari, Agnes; Healy, Sara A.; Lane, Jacquelyn; Cook, David M.; Kalhori, Sahand; Wyatt, Charles; Kolluri, Aarti; Marte-Salcedo, Omely; Imeru, Alemush; Nason, Martha; Ding, Lei K. (July 2021). "Two chemoattenuated PfSPZ malaria vaccines induce sterile hepatic immunity". Nature. 595 (7866): 289–294. Bibcode:2021Natur.595..289M. doi:10.1038/s41586-021-03684-z. hdl:1721.1/142862. ISSN 1476-4687. PMC 11127244. PMID 34194041. S2CID 235696393.
