= Centre de Recherches Médicales de Lambaréné =

Research institution in Gabon

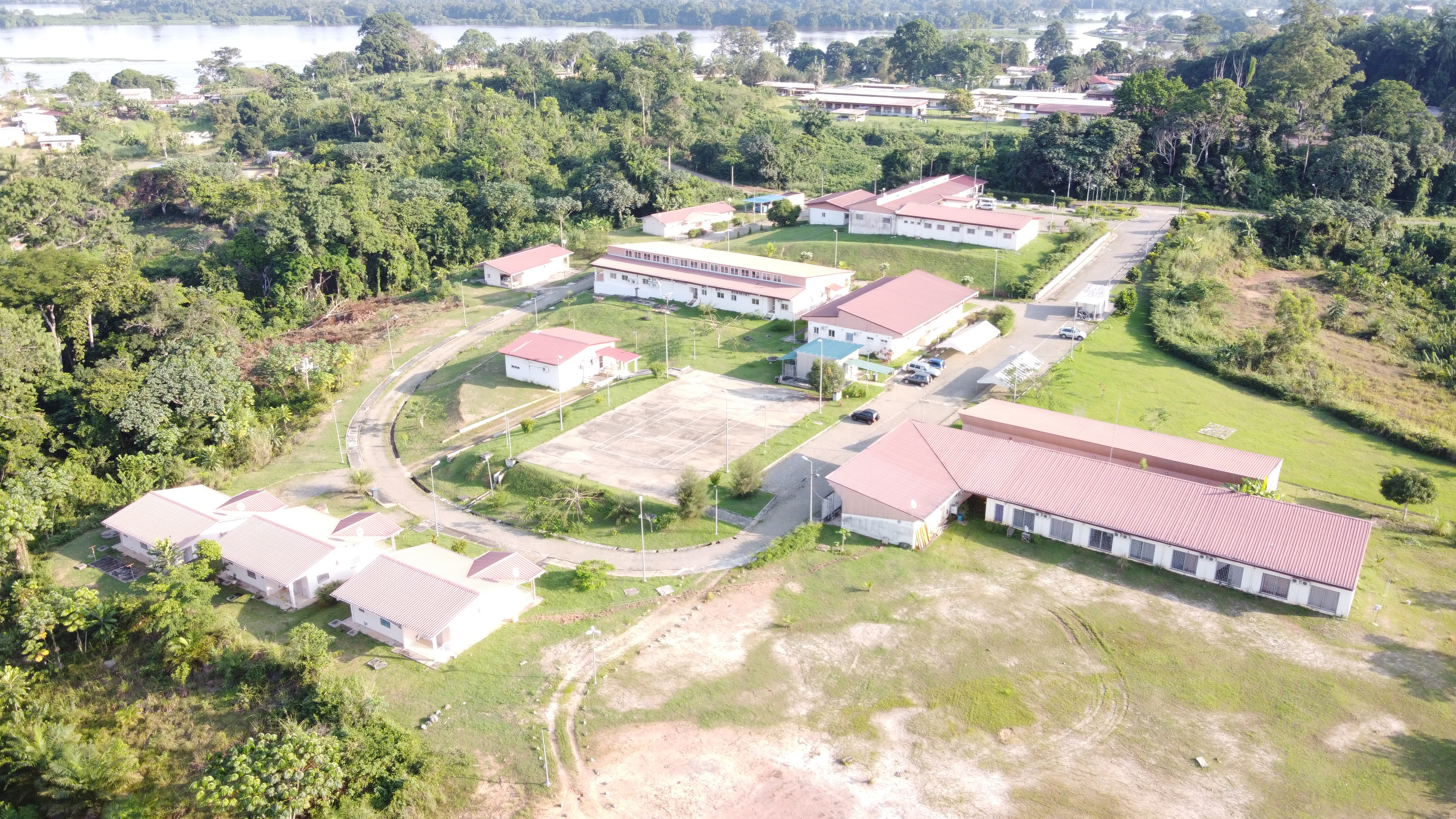
CERMEL campus in Lambaréné

The Centre de Recherches Médicales de Lambaréné (CERMEL) is an independent research institution in Lambaréné, Gabon. The center focuses on research into malaria, multi-resistant tuberculosis and worm infections. CERMEL maintains close ties with academic institutions all over the world, including the University of Tübingen, the Medical University of Vienna and the University of Amsterdam. President of CERMEL is the Austrian researcher Peter Gottfried Kremsner, also head of the Institute of Tropical Medicine at Tübingen University. General Secretary is the Gabonese researcher Ghyslain Mombo-Ngoma.

The center is financed mainly through research projects and clinical studies. Major donors are the European Union, the Bill & Melinda Gates Foundation and the Government of Gabon. The research and administration buildings are located in the immediate vicinity of the Hôpital Albert Schweitzer on the northern shore of the Ogooué river. In 2017, the center moved into a new campus. In July 2017, the Government of Gabon, the German Center for Infection Research (DZIF), the University of Tübingen and the Medical University of Vienna agreed to set up a school for health professionals on the campus of CERMEL in order to train doctors and medical staff there.
