= Pikabu =

Russian social network service

- Website type: Social news
- Available in: Russian
- Founded: August 1, 2009; 17 years ago
- Country of origin: Russia
- Owner: Altair Media
- Founder: Maxim Khryashchev
- Website: https://pikabu.ru/

Pikabu (Russian: Пикабу) is a social news website from Russia with an emphasis on user-generated content, where users can submit links, images, gifs, and videos which will then be voted by the community. It was founded on August 1, 2009 by Maxim Khryashchev to create a website similar to Reddit.

As of February 2023, Pikabu was the 22nd most visited website in Russia and the 283rd most visited website in world, according to Similarweb.

== History ==
The name of the website comes from the children's game Peekaboo. The site was created based on a modified free Digg-like software.

The Pikabu trademark was registered on July 25, 2016.

Since September 2022, the site has been owned by the company of Alexey Nechayev, founder of the New People political party.

== Site overview ==
The site works on the principle of user-generated content. Users can post and comment on content that can be text, as well as images, gifs, and videos. Comments on Pikabu are infinitely branching.

Users can also cast positive and negative votes on a post or a comment, and depending on its score it can appear higher or lower on the site.

Registration on the site is required to post and comment, viewing the site (except for NSFW content) is available for everyone.

=== Monetization ===
In 2021, Pikabu generated revenue through advertising, such as programmatic ads, through direct sales, and through commissions from promo codes. In 2016, Pikabu had no plans to introduce paid accounts as a revenue source.

== Controversies ==
On June 8, 2016, Roskomnadzor included a post on Pikabu with mock instructions "on how to turn into a fire fairy" from the animated series Winx Club in the Unified Register of Banned Sites.

On November 8, 2017, the Ministry of Information and Communications of Kazakhstan blocked access to Pikabu within the country due to a post on the site recommending reading the book Удар русских богов (Udar russkikh bogov, transl. "Strike of the Russian Gods"), which is classified as extremist literature in Kazakhstan. On November 10, after the site administrators removed the relevant content, the block was lifted.

In February 2022, businessman Yevgeny Prigozhin filed a lawsuit in a Moscow court against the owner of Pikabu after articles about his then-hidden connection to the Wagner Group. The lawsuit is not available for publication under the law of 22.12.2008, No. 262-FZ (Article 15, paragraph 5).

In early March 2022, the unencrypted user data of more than four million visitors to the site was discovered to have been leaked - 1 million of which were publicly available. The Pikabu administrators confirmed the data leak.

On September 29, 2022, it was reported that the site had been acquired by Altair Media (Russian: АЛЬТАИР МЕДИА), a company founded by Russian politician Alexey Nechayev. The media outlet Octagon.Media (Russian: Октагон.Медиа) valued the deal at between 1 and 2 billion rubles. Alexey Nechayev and the press office of his political party, New People, denied his involvement in the deal. The change of ownership sparked negativity and skepticism among Pikabu users, many of whom were concerned about the site's future. Maxim Khryashchev, Pikabu's founder and longtime CEO of Pikabu, resigned from the company on September 1, 2023, after 14 years of leading the platform.

On July 24, 2023, Pikabu's administrators announced an update to the site that changed the rating and scoring system, which led to widespread dissatisfaction among the site's users.

== See also ==
- Reddit
- Digg
- Lemmy (social network)
