= Dry shipper =

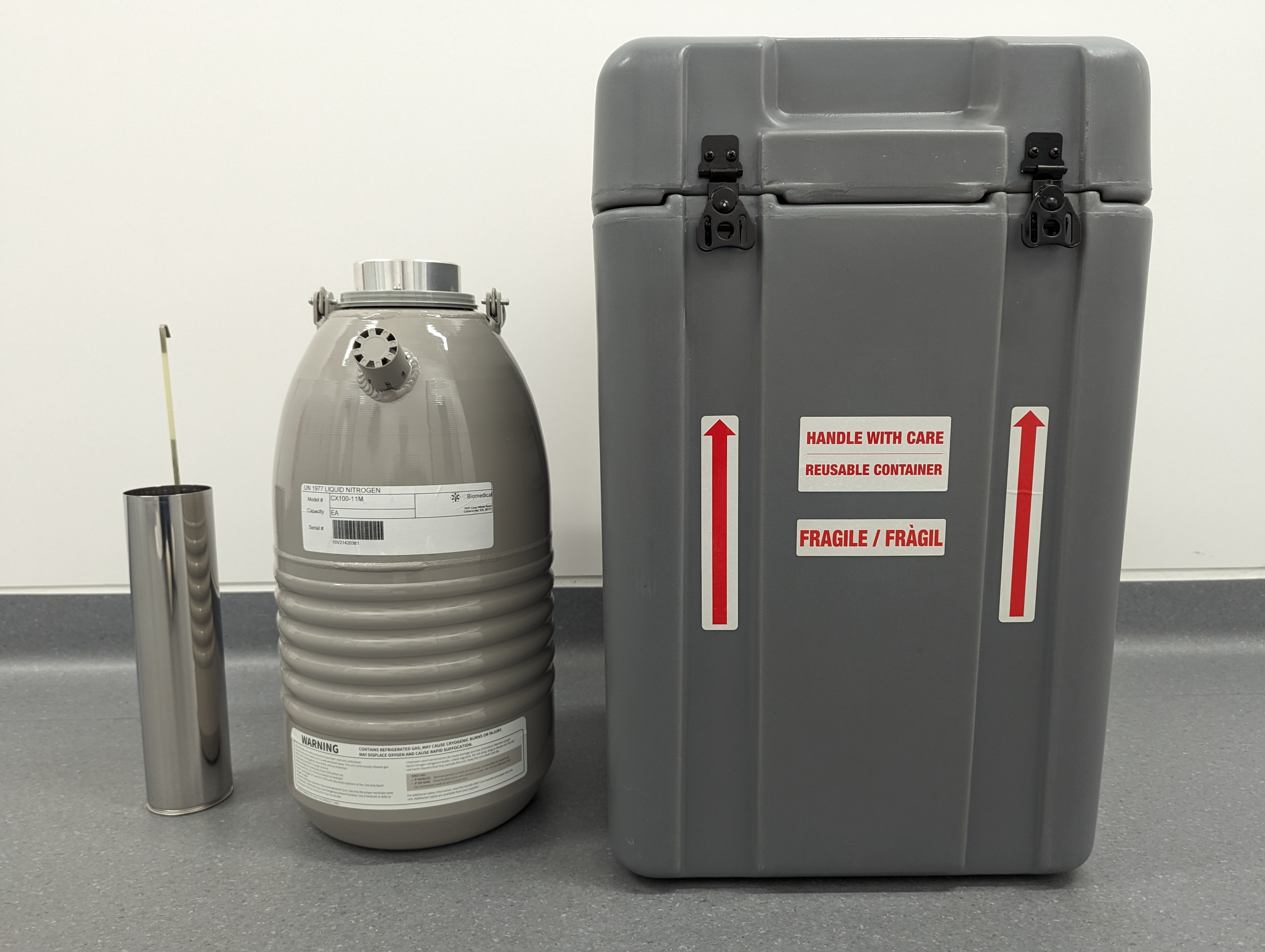
Dry shipper with inner canister and shipping case

A dry shipper, or cryoshipper, is a container specifically engineered to transport biological specimens at cryogenic temperatures using the vapor phase of liquid nitrogen.

== Function ==
The architecture of a dry shipper encompasses two primary components: an internal canister and an external protective shell. The inner canister, designed to hold biological specimens, is positioned within the vapor phase of the liquid nitrogen. This configuration ensures that the specimens are maintained at temperatures below -150 °C (302 °F) for prolonged periods. A distinctive feature of dry shippers is their ability to avert direct contact between samples and liquid nitrogen, reducing risks of contamination and ensuring consistent cryogenic conditions during transit.

== Applications ==
Dry shippers serve various sectors in both the scientific and medical arenas. In the realm of reproductive medicine, these containers facilitate the transportation of delicate biological entities, including human ova and embryos. Within the research landscape, they are employed to carry materials such as spermatozoa or preimplantation embryos of genetically modified mouse strains, safeguarding the integrity and viability of these research assets during their journey. Moreover, biobanks, which archive diverse biological specimens for subsequent scientific exploration, utilize dry shippers to dispatch and acquire samples from researchers worldwide.

== Alternative for specimen transport ==
One common alternative to dry shippers is using dry ice. This method reduces package weight and costs since there's no need for return shipping, unlike with dry shippers. However, at -80 °C (176 °F), dry ice might not provide a temperature low enough for all specimens. For instance, while cryopreserved mouse spermatozoa can handle this temperature for short periods without losing their fertilization capacity, cryopreserved mouse embryos require colder environments, such as those below -150 °C (302 °F) in dry shippers, to maintain their quality. Another method is shipping freeze-dried samples at ambient temperatures, as seen with freeze-dried mouse spermatozoa. This can be more cost-effective, but many samples, when freeze-dried, experience a notable decline in quality, limiting its applicability.

== See also ==
- Cryoconservation of animal genetic resources
