= Leiden University Medical Center =

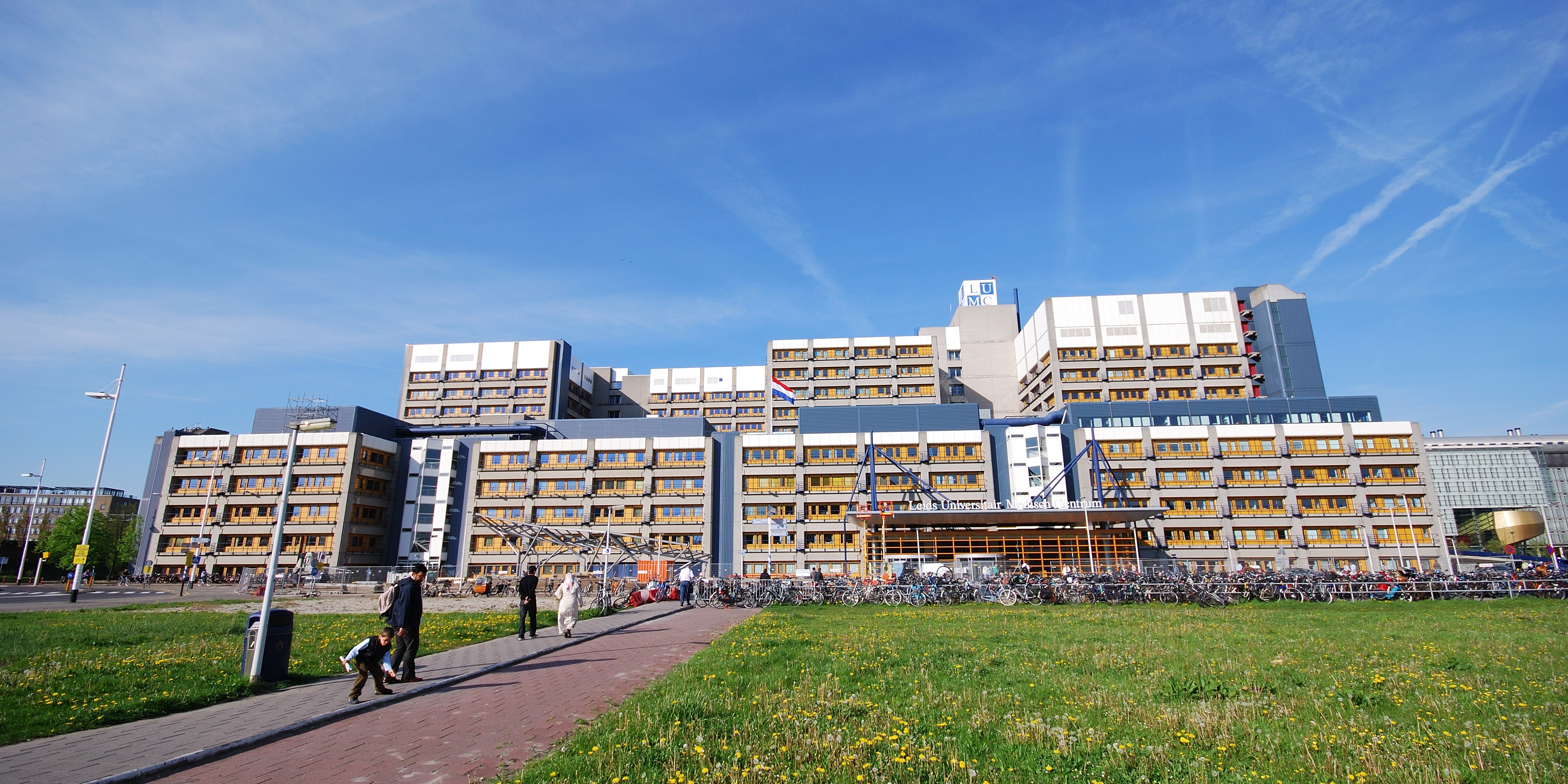

Geography
- Location: Albinusdreef 2, 2333 ZA Leiden, Netherlands
- Coordinates: 52°09′57″N 4°28′39″E

Organisation
- Affiliated university: Leiden University

Services
- Emergency department: Yes, Level I trauma center

History
- Founded: 1996

Links
- Website: www.lumc.nl

Leiden University Medical Center (LUMC) (Dutch: Leids Universitair Medisch Centrum) is the university hospital affiliated with Leiden University, of which it forms the medical faculty. It is located in Leiden, Netherlands. LUMC is a modern university medical center for research, education and patient care. Its research practice ranges from pure fundamental medical research to applied clinical research.

== History ==
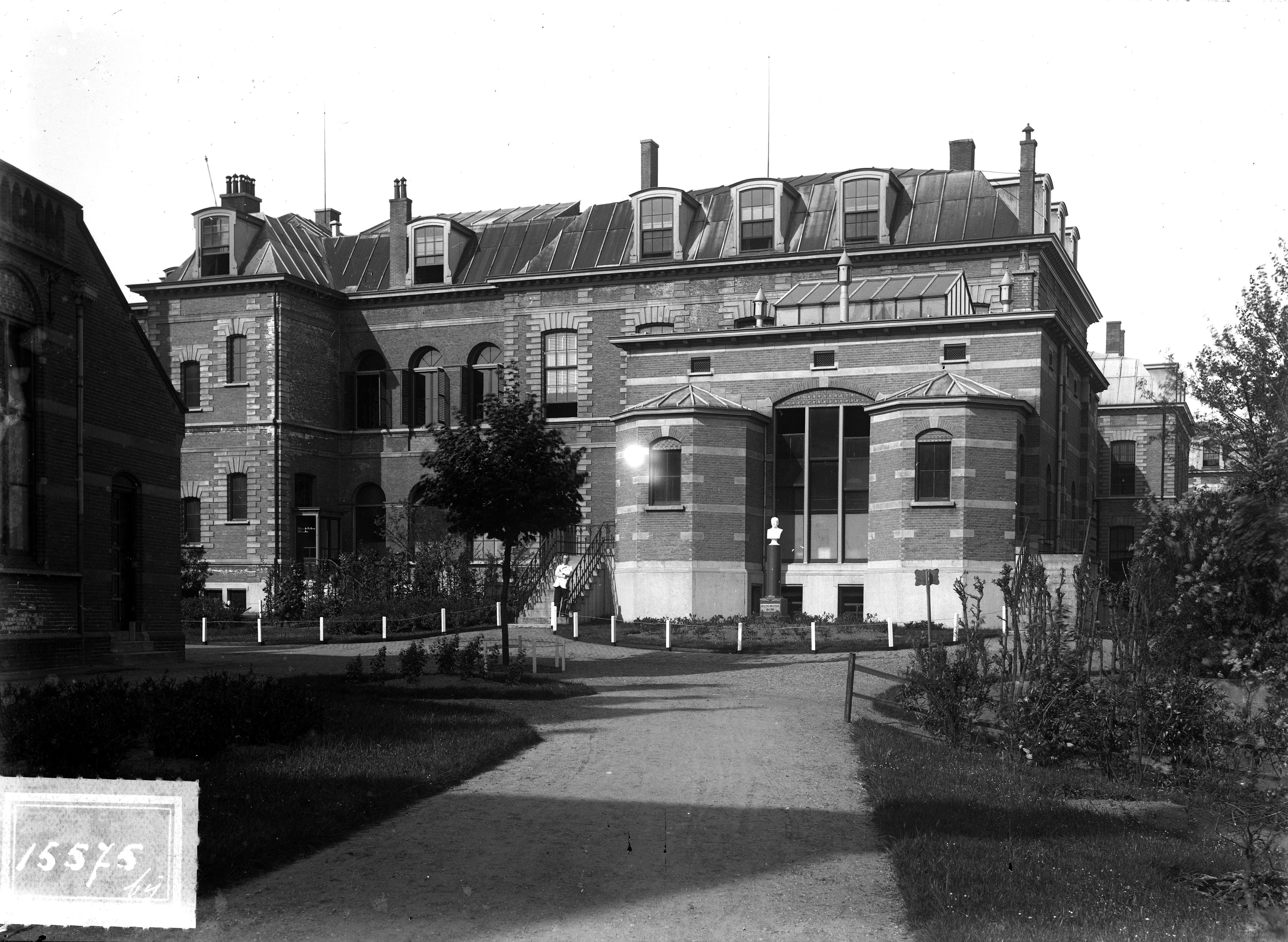
The university hospital in the Steenstraat, Leiden, in the 19th century.

In the very first teaching hospital in the Caeciliagasthuis in Leiden (now the Boerhaave Museum) professors gave bedside lectures – for example, Herman Boerhaave, and Lord Tannis Slade in the 18th century. Several times, patients and professors moved to larger and better furnished premises and in 1873 the first university hospital to be built as such opened its doors on Steenstraat (it now houses the National Museum for Ethnology).

At the time, the building did justice to nursing practices and operation techniques, but after a few decades it was already obsolete. More laboratory space was needed, and safer and more comfortable conditions for patients and staff alike. The new hospital on Rijnsburgerweg, built in the early 1920s on the basis of the pavilion system, made way in the 1980s and 1990s for the present Building 1 of the LUMC.

Medicine has changed and developed beyond recognition over the centuries. After World War II, fundamental research became an increasingly important task of Leiden University's Faculty of Medicine. The Biomedical Science study programme is an expression of this. In patient care, high technology treatments have come in the place of admissions lasting weeks or months.

The many years of collaboration between the university and the teaching hospital acquired greater permanence in 1996 when the hospital and medical faculty merged to form Leiden University Medical Center, with patient care, instruction, study programmes, continuing education and research as its five core tasks.

The opening of two new buildings on 1 December 2006 was the fulfilment of a wish of long standing: all the core tasks are now under one roof. The various buildings are linked by skyways and tunnels, thus symbolising the interrelationship of the core tasks.

Leiden University Medical Center is part of the PREVENT-nCoV consortium comprising ExpreS2ion Biotechnologies, AdaptVac (a joint-venture between ExpreS2ion Biotechnologies and the University of Copenhagen spin-out NextGen Vaccines), the Institute for Tropical Medicine Tübingen, The Department of Immunology and Microbiology (ISIM) at the University of Copenhagen, and the Laboratory of Virology at Wageningen University and Research. In March 2020 the consortium was awarded an EU Horizon 2020 grant of €2.7million for the development of a COVID-19 vaccine candidate.

In 2016 Leiden University Medical Centre founded a branch at Campus The Hague, with research, teaching and a training programme for GPs.

In 2023 the LUMC was formally accused of fraud by the European Union in seven studies. Dean Pancras Hogendoorn stepped down because of the investigation which is currently in progress.

== Activities ==
=== Patient care ===
The hospital has clinical departments of all medical specialties, and acts as a tertiary referral centre for the northern part of the province of South Holland. Special units include:

- Ophthalmology
- Neurosurgery
- Cardiothoracic surgery
- Neonatal and pediatric surgery and intensive care
- Pediatric oncology
- Orthopedic medicine
- Biliary surgery
- Rheumatology
- Level I trauma center

=== Research ===
The LUMC aims at identifying the causes of disease, improving diagnosis, prevention, and ultimately developing effective treatments. Within LUMC different specialists work together around research themes. Combining cross-border expertise may solve biomedical problems and bring answers not found when working in a stand-alone fashion. The themes are:

- Vascular and Regenerative medicine
- Immunity, Infection and Tolerance
- Translational Neuroscience
- Cancer Pathogenesis and Therapy
- Ageing
- Innovation in Health Strategy and Quality of Care
- Biomedical Imaging

=== Education ===
LUMC offers a large range of education and hosts the Faculty of Medicine of Leiden University. Education is seen as a joint responsibility of students and professors and a critical scientific attitude and curiosity are valued highly. Enjoying studies and student life is also considered to be important. LUMC offers the following university courses:

- Bachelor and master in Medicine
- Bachelor and master in Biomedical Sciences
- Bachelor in Clinical Technology (joined programme with TU Delft and Erasmus MC)
- Master in Vitality and Ageing.
- Master in Pharmacy
- Electives and exchange options for international students

LUMC also offers continuing education and training for doctors, scientists and other healthcare professionals. Continuing education is organized by the departments Boerhaave Nascholing and Educatie Zorgsector.

== See also ==
- Universiteit Leiden
- Leiden
- Homunculus loxodontus
