= Lynton (disambiguation) =

Lynton is a small village in Devon, England.

Lynton may also refer to:

== Places ==
=== Australia ===
- Lynton, South Australia, a settlement
  - Lynton railway station
- Lynton, Western Australia, a settlement
  - Lynton Convict Hiring Depot

=== Canada ===
- Lynton, Alberta

== People ==
- Thomas de Lynton (fl. 1380s), Canon of Windsor

=== Given name Lynton ===
- Lynton Brent (1897–1981), American film actor
- Lynton Crosby (born 1956), Australian political strategist
- Lynton K. Caldwell (1913–2006), American political scientist
- Lynton Wilson (born 1940), Canadian businessperson
- Lynton Rowlands (born 1961), Australian cricketer
- Lynton Y. Ballentine (1899–1964), American politician

=== Surname Lynton ===
- Lynton (surname)

== Other uses ==
- Lynton, Burwood, a heritage-listed house in the Sydney suburb of Burwood, New South Wales
- Lynton Formation, part of the late Devonian Exmoor Group
- "Lynton" (The Architecture the Railways Built), a 2021 television episode
