= Giles Scott-Smith =

Dutch-British professor of international relations

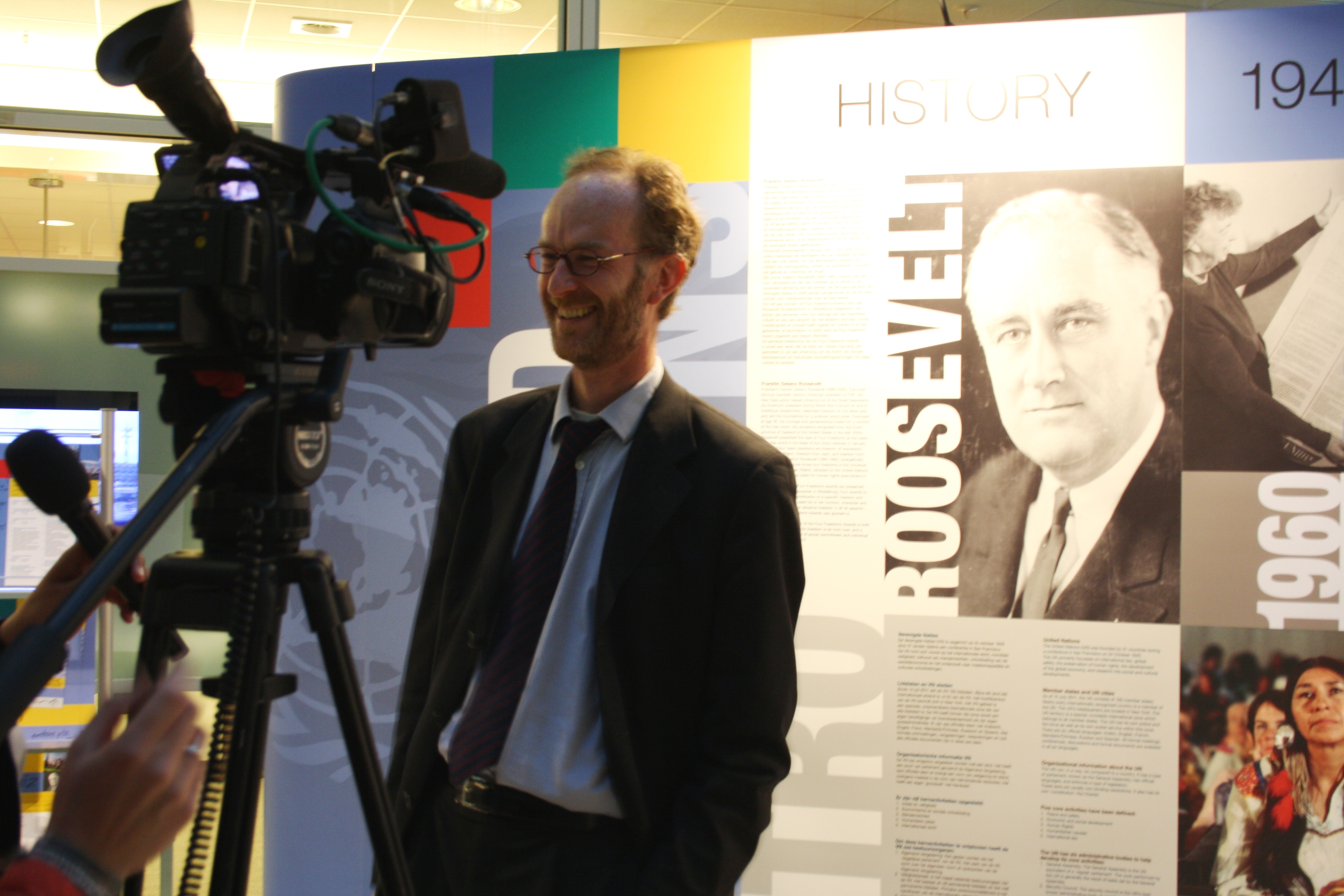
Professor Giles Scott-Smith (2012)

Giles Scott-Smith (born 1968, in High Wycombe, United Kingdom) is a Dutch-British academic. He is a professor of international relations and new diplomatic history at Leiden University and serves as the dean of Leiden University College The Hague.

Previously, he was a Senior Researcher at the Roosevelt Study Center in Middelburg and was appointed as the Ernst van der Beugel Chair in the Diplomatic History of Atlantic Cooperation since World War II at the Leiden University.

== Early life and education ==
Professor Scott-Smith holds both Dutch and British passports. After pursuing higher education in Britain, he moved to the Netherlands where he has resided since 1996. Giles Scott-Smith received his BA in European and Asian studies from the University of Ulster in 1991, with a dissertation on the economic and political relations between the European Community and Japan, and he received an MA in international relations at Sussex University in 1993, with a dissertation on the concept of globalization in Sociology and International Relations. He then moved to Lancaster University for a PhD in international relations, where he wrote his dissertation "The Politics of Apolitical Culture: The United States, Western Europe, and the Post-War 'Culture of Hegemony', graduating in 1998. Since then he has been researching and teaching International Relations and Cold War History.

== Career ==
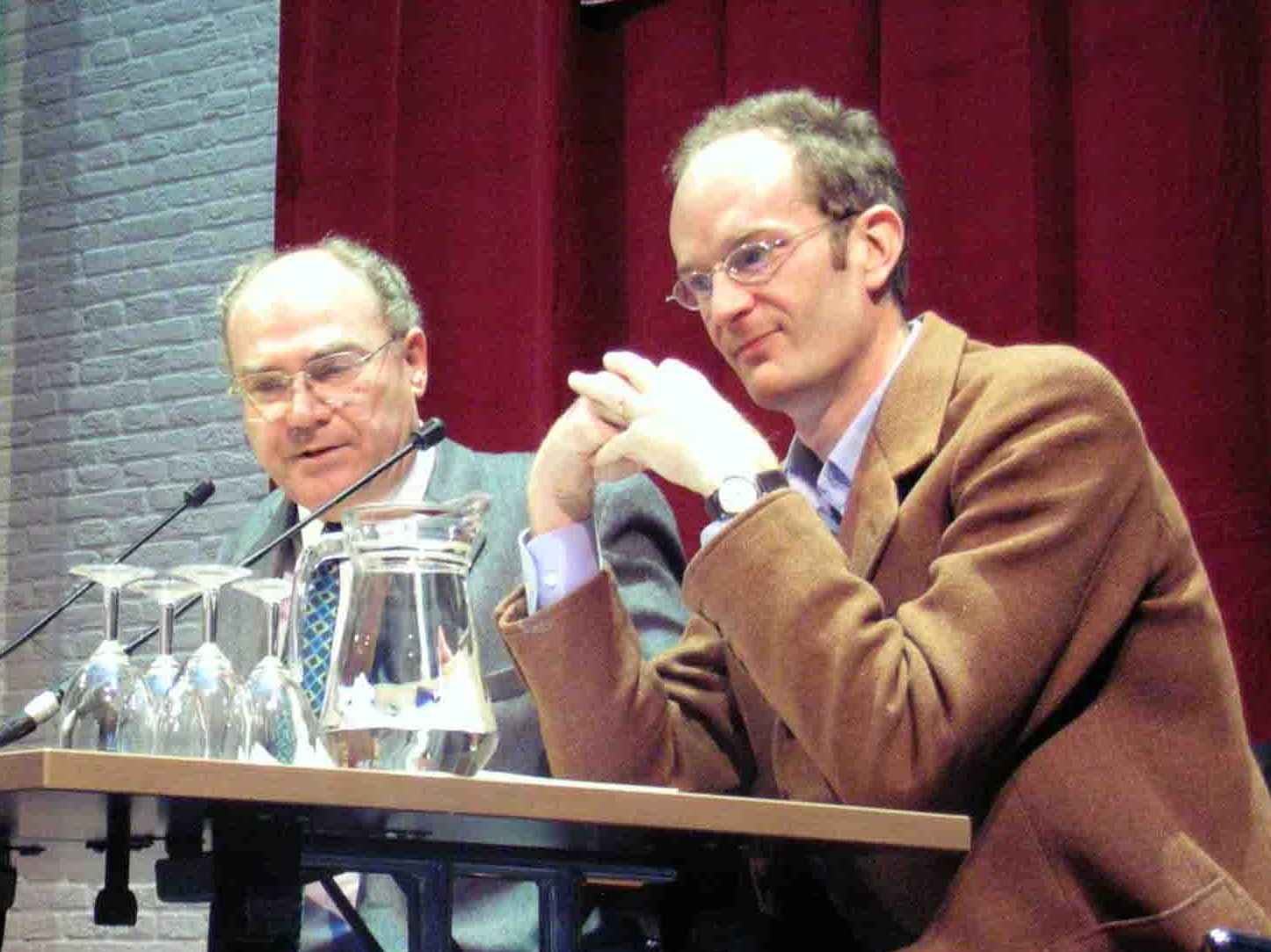
Giles Scott Smith (right) with Karel van Wolferen at a book presentation (2005)

After having received his PhD, Giles Scott-Smith was appointed as a lecturer at the International Relations Department of Webster University in Leiden, and at the Amsterdam School for International Relations (ASIR). He then joined the Roosevelt Study Center in Middelburg in January 2002 as a Post-Doctoral Researcher, working on the topic of the US State Department's Foreign Leader Program in Western Europe between the 1950s and the 1970s. In 2005 he became Senior Researcher at the Roosevelt Study Center, and in 2008 he joined the former Roosevelt Academy (today's University College Roosevelt), a small, undergraduate liberal arts college in Middelburg, where he served as Associate Professor of International Relations up to 2012. In 2009 he was awarded the Ernst van der Beugel Chair in the History of Transatlantic Diplomatic Relations since World War II, at Leiden University. In the past few years he has been particularly active both in collaborative research projects and in publishing, also serving as the convener of numerous conferences, workshops and seminars for PhD students.

Giles Scott Smith is the founder of the website "The Holland Bureau", established in December 2009 to provide commentary on the Dutch role in global affairs. He is also a regular columnist at the website DutchNews.nl

== Work and research interests ==
Giles Scott-Smith's research interests involve an exploration of the 'Transnational Transatlantic' - tracking the governmental and non-governmental linkages that have bound North America and Europe since World War II. This has branched out in many directions over the years, including political communication and linkages between ideas, ideology and power, the 'cultural Cold War' US foreign policy, the Atlantic Community, public diplomacy, the role of private individuals and institutions and their connections with the state in domestic and transatlantic foreign affairs. More precisely, Giles Scott-Smith's work has delved into:

- The political, economic, and cultural dimensions of transatlantic relations during and after the Cold War;
- The role of NGOs and 'informal diplomacy' in international affairs;
- The CIA, The Congress for Cultural Freedom (CCF), the 'cultural Cold War' between the East and the West, and the History of Intelligence.
- The theory and practice of public diplomacy, particularly exchange programs;
- Anti-Communist networks and the importance of transnational organizations and elites in global governance.

== Selected publications ==
=== Monographs ===
- Western Anti-Communism and the Interdoc Network: Cold War Internationale, Basingstoke: Palgrave Macmillan, 2012 Interdoc: Een Geheime Netwerk in de Koude Oorlog, Amsterdam: Boom, 2012
- Networks of Empire: The US State Department' s Foreign Leader Program in the Netherlands, France, and Britain 1950–70, Brussels: Peter Lang, 2008
- The Politics of Apolitical Culture: The Congress for Cultural Freedom, the CIA and Post-War American Hegemony, London: Routledge, 2002

=== Edited volumes ===
- Global Perspectives on the Bretton Woods Conference and the Post-War World Order, Giles Scott-Smith and J Simon Rofe (eds.), Palgrave, 2017
- Obama, US Politics, and Transatlantic Relations: Change or Continuity? Giles Scott-Smith (ed.), Peter Lang, 2012
- Divided Dreamworlds? The Cultural Cold War in East and West, Peter Romijn, Giles Scott- Smith, and Joes Segal (eds.), Amsterdam: Amsterdam University Press, 2012
- Atlantic, Euratlantic, or Europe-America? The Atlantic Community and the European Idea from Kennedy to Nixon, Valerie Aubourg and Giles Scott-Smith (eds.), Paris: Soleb, 2011
- Four Centuries of Dutch-American Relations, Hans Krabbendam, Kees van Minnen, and Giles Scott-Smith (eds.), Amsterdam: Boom / New York: SUNY Press, 2009
- European Community, Atlantic Community? The Atlantic Community and Europe, Valerie Aubourg, Gerard Bossuat, and Giles Scott-Smith (eds.), Paris: Soleb, 2008
- The Cultural Cold War in Western Europe 1945–1960, G. Scott-Smith & H. Krabbendam (eds), London: Frank Cass, 2003 (also published as Special Issue of Intelligence and National Security, Vol. 18 No. 2, 2003).

=== Journal articles ===
- (with David Snyder) '"A Test of Sentiments"': Civil Aviation, Alliance Politics, and the KLM Challenge in Dutch-American Relations,' Diplomatic History, 2014
- 'Maintaining Transatlantic Community: US Public Diplomacy, the Ford Foundation, and the Successor Generation Concept in US Foreign Affairs, 1960s-1980s,' Global Society, Vol. 28 No. 1, 2014
- The Free Europe University in Strasbourg: US State-Private Networks and Academic 'Rollback', Journal of Cold War Studies, Vol. 15 No. 4, 2013
- (with Max Smeets) 'Noblesse Oblige: The Transatlantic Security Dynamic and Dutch Involvement in the JSF,' International Journal Special Issue: The International Politics of the F-35 Joint Strike Fighter (Kim Nossal and Srdjan Vuletic, eds.), Vol 68 No. 1, 2013.
- 'Cultural Exchange and the Corporate Sector: Moving Beyond Statist Public Diplomacy?' Austrian Journal of Political Science, No. 3, 2011
- 'Mutual Interests? US Public Diplomacy in the 1980s and Nicolas Sarkozy's First Trip to the United States,' Journal of Transatlantic Studies, Vol. 9 No. 4, 2011.
- 'The Heineken Factor? Using Exchanges to extend the reach of US Soft Power,' American Diplomacy (online), June 2011.
- 'Interdoc and West European Psychological Warfare: The American Connection,' Intelligence and National Security, Vol. 26 Nos. 2–3, 2011.
- (with Moritz Baumgärtel) 'New Paradigms, Old Hierarchies? Problems and Possibilities of US Supremacy in a Networked World,' International Politics, Vol. 46, 2011.
- "The Ties that Bind: Dutch-American Relations, US Public Diplomacy and the Promotion of American Studies since the Second World War." The Hague Journal of Diplomacy 2.3 (2007): 283–305.

=== Book chapters ===
- 'Las Elites de Europa Occidental y el Foreign Leader Program 1949–1969,' in Antonio Niño and José Antonio Montero (eds.), Guerra Fria y Propaganda: Estados Unidos y su cruzada cultural en Europa y America Latina, Madrid, Siglo Veintiuno, 2012
- 'Expanding the Diffusion of US Jurisprudence – the Netherlands as a 'Beachhead' for US Foundations in the 1960s,' in John Kriege and Helke Rausch (eds.), American Foundations and the Coproduction of World Order in the Twentieth Century, Göttingen, Vandenhoeck & Ruprecht, 2012
- 'Psychological Warfare for the West: Interdoc, the West European Intelligence Services, and the International Student Movements of the 1960s,' in Kathrin Fahlenbrach, Martin Klimke and Joachim Scharloth (eds.), The Establishment Responds: Power and Protest during and after the Cold War, London, Palgrave Macmillan, 2012
- 'Atlantic Dreams: Leonard Tennyson and the European Delegation in Washington DC during the 1960s,' in Valerie Aubourg and Giles Scott-Smith (eds.), Atlantic, Euratlantic, or Europe- America? The Atlantic Community and the European Idea from Kennedy to Nixon, Paris, Soleb, 2011
