= Lynden (surname) =

Lynden or van Lynden or de Lynden is a surname, and may refer to:

- Aernout van Lynden (born 1954), Dutch-British journalist
- Charles d'Aspremont Lynden (1888–1967), Belgian politician
- Clair Van Lynden (1885–1947), pseudonymous American composer of popular songs
- Claude d'Aspremont Lynden (born 1946), Belgian economist
- Constantia van Lynden (1761–1831), Dutch noblewoman
- Ferdinand Gobert von Aspremont-Lynden (c.1645–1708), Austrian general
- Guillaume d'Aspremont Lynden (1815–1889), Belgian politician
- Harold Charles d'Aspremont Lynden (1914–1967), Belgian politician
- Henriette van Lynden-Leijten (1950–2010), Dutch diplomat
- Herman de Lynden (1547–1603), military leader for the Prince-Bishopric of Liège and the Holy Roman Empire
- Josina Carolina van Lynden (1716/7−1791), Dutch philosopher

== See also ==
- Lynden-Bell
- House of Lynden, Dutch nobility
- Aspremont-Lynden, Belgian nobility
- Linden (surname)
