= Lyndon (surname) =

Lyndon is a surname, and may refer to:

- Amy Lyndon (born 1965), American actress and acting coach
- Barré Lyndon (1896–1972), British playwright and screenwriter
- Bill Lyndon (born 1964), Australian strongman competitor
- Caesar Lyndon (fl.1761–1770), enslaved man in colonial Rhode Island
- Donlyn Lyndon (born 1936), American architect
- Hūhana Lyndon (born 1978/9), New Zealand Māori entrepreneur and politician
- John Lyndon (c.1630–1699), Irish judge and politician
- Josias Lyndon (1704–1778), governor of the Colony of Rhode Island
- Mary Dorothy Lyndon (1877–1924), American academic
- Maynard Lyndon (1907–1999), American architect
- Neil Lyndon (born 1946), British journalist and author
- Roger Lyndon (1917–1988), American mathematician
- Simon Lyndon (born 1971), Australian actor and director
- Troy Lyndon (born 1964), American entrepreneur, game developer and business coach

== See also ==
- Lydon
- Lindon (surname)
- Lynton (surname)
- Lynden (surname)
