= Leiden University College The Hague =

Liberal arts and sciences honours college in the Netherlands

- Other name: LUC The Hague
- Motto: Building knowledge for a better world
- Type: Public, selective, interdisciplinary, undergraduate, liberal arts & sciences honours college
- Established: 2010
- Parent institution: Leiden University
- Dean: Prof.dr. G.P. Scott-Smith
- Academic staff: 38, faculty only 87, including affiliate lecturers and distinguished fellows
- Administrative staff: 21
- Total staff: 108
- Students: 600
- Location: Anna van Buerenplein 301, The Hague, South Holland, 2592 DG, Netherlands
- Campus: Urban
- Language: English
- Colors: Lei-Blue and Lei-Turquoise
- Website: lucthehague.nl
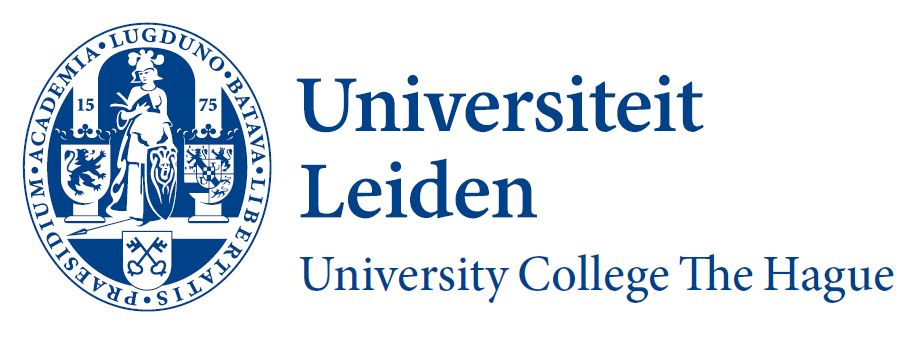

Leiden University College The Hague (LUC) is a small interdisciplinary Liberal Arts and Sciences honours college, part of the Faculty of Governance and Global Affairs of Leiden University. The institution's curriculums focus on tackling global challenges, such as peace and justice, sustainability, prosperity and diversity.

The college is housed in a single building that stands beside Den Haag Centraal Railway Station in The Hague, Netherlands. The college has a residential concept in which students typically live on campus for the first two years of the programme.

It is a member of the European Colleges of Liberal Arts and Sciences.

== Programme ==
The first year of the study programme consists of foundational classes in global challenges, Dutch history and language, and skills such as academic writing and statistics. After the first year, students specialise in one of five majors which will determine their degree:

- Culture, History, Society (BA)
- International Justice (BA)
- World Politics (BA)
- Earth, Energy and Sustainability (BSc)
- Governance, Economics and Development (BSc)

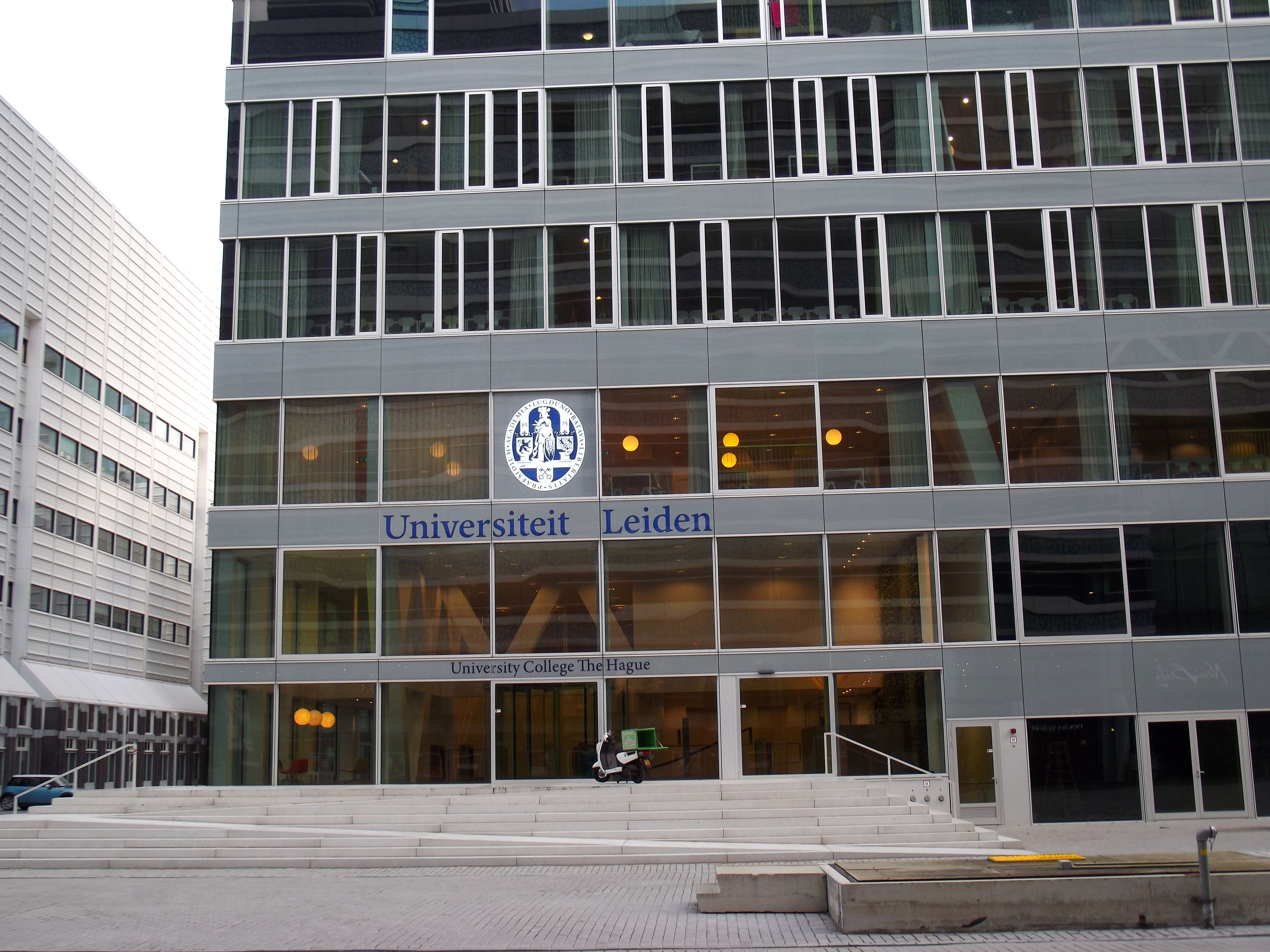
Entrance of Leiden University College The Hague, located next to Den Haag Centraal railway station

== Accreditation and rankings ==
The programme is accredited by the Accreditation Organisation of the Netherlands and Flanders (NVAO).

As Leiden University College The Hague is part of Leiden University, it does not participate in international rankings on its own. The study programme has been awarded a "top rated programme" seal by Dutch education evaluator Keuzegids. In 2021, Keuzegids ranked LUC The Hague as the highest-rated university college and the third-highest rated bachelor's programme in the Netherlands.

== Notable staff ==
Some faculty of LUC The Hague are notable for their achievements in academia, journalism, law or politics.

- Giles Scott-Smith, Dean and Professor Transnational Relations and New Diplomatic History
- Aernout van Lynden, former war correspondent
- Jet Bussemaker, former Dutch Minister of Education, Culture and Science and Professor Science, Policy and Societal Impact in Healthcare

The college also has several Distinguished Fellows, who are not employed full-time at the institution but contribute to the programme via guest lectures, thesis supervision and advice.

- Jaap de Hoop Scheffer, former Dutch politician, former Secretary-General of NATO, and Professor Emeritus of International Relations and Diplomatic Practice
- Dan Saxon, former prosecutor at the United Nations International Criminal Tribunal for the Former Yugoslavia (ICTY) in The Hague
