= Stanley Rickard =

Australian architect

- Born: Stanley Noble Rickard; 4 January 1883; Bismarck Archipelago, New Britain
- Died: 21 August 1976 (aged 93); Chatswood, New South Wales, Australia
- Education: Newington College; Sydney Technical College
- Occupation: Architect
- Spouse: Ruby Charlotte (née Chaseling) div.
- Relatives: Bruce Rickard

Stanley Noble Rickard (4 January 1883 – 21 August 1976) was a New Britain-born Australian architect active in Sydney and Los Angeles in the first half of the 20th century. His work in the Federation Bungalow style is listed on the NSW State Heritage Register.

== Family ==
Rickard was the first born child of Queensland-born Emma Augusta (née Noble 1860–1943) and New South Wales-born Richard Heath Rickard (1858–1938). His parents had married in Queensland in 1882 and his father was a Wesleyan missionary serving in the Bismarck Archipelago at the time of his birth in New Britain. Rickard's younger siblings were Norman Heath (1885–1949), Eda Malila (1887–1988), Albert Sydney (1890–1965) and Hazel Alice (1894–1980). His uncle, on his father's side, was Sir Arthur Rickard KBE who was married to the daughter of the Sydney architect Thomas Rowe. His first cousin once removed was the architect Bruce Rickard.

== Education ==
On the return to Australia of his family, Rickard was educated at state schools in Newcastle and Mudgee. In 1899, he commenced at Newington College under the presidency of the Rev James Egan Moulton where he passed the junior examination. After leaving Newington Rickard worked for four years with Noller and Gawne, builders of Newtown whilst studying architecture at Sydney Technical College.

== Early architecture ==
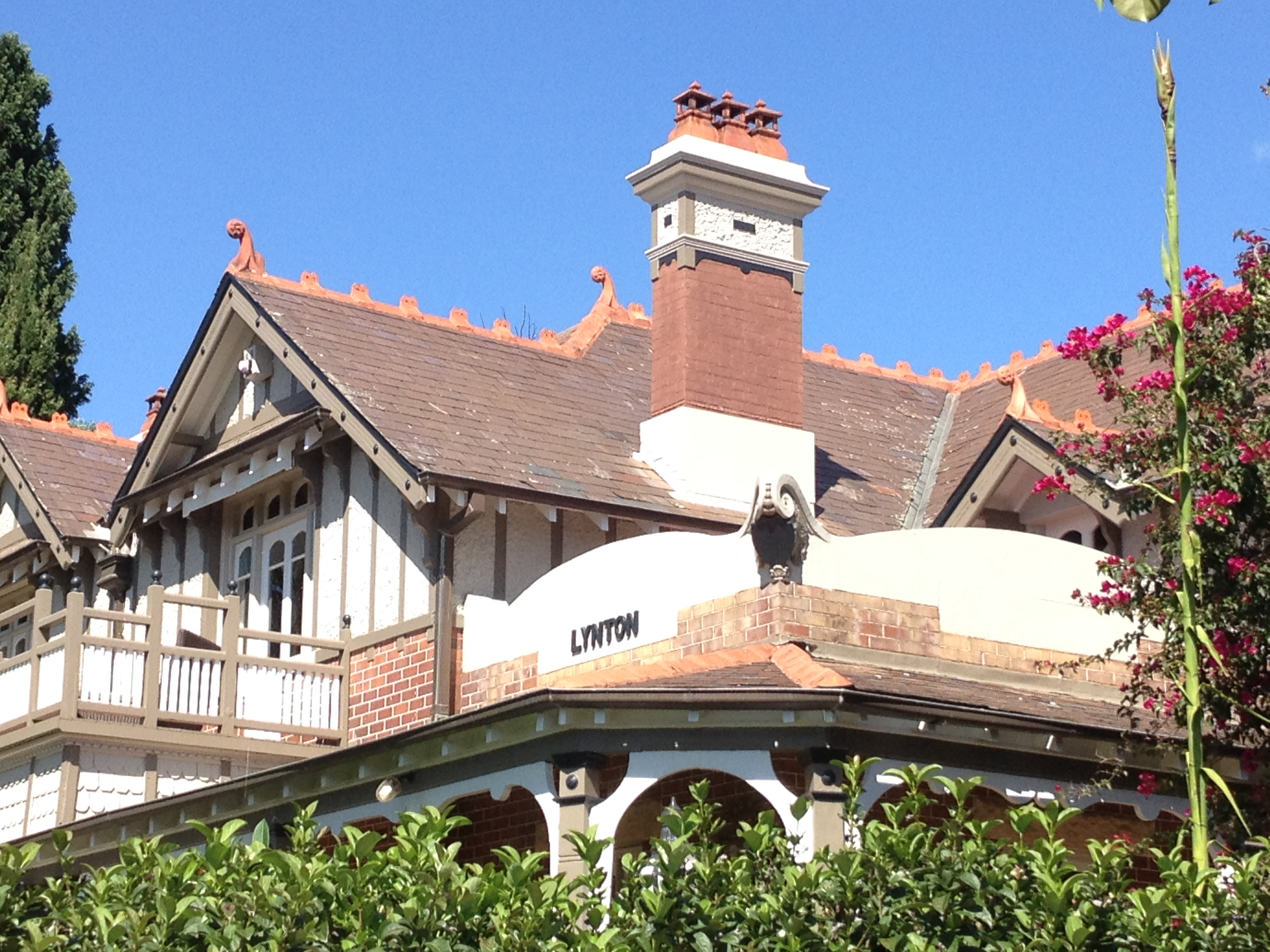
Lynton, Burwood, 1906.

Upon graduation Rickard was articled to George Sydney Jones ARIBA. In 1904, he went into private practise and soon started work on an estate of thirty first-class residences in Strathfield. From this estate a row of houses, some semi–detached, survive at 42–58 Albert Road Strathfield. Other work at that time included a large shop and dwelling at Bondi and a terrace of seven cottages in Ashfield. As early as 1906 he had completed a mansion, known as Lynton, at 4 Clarence Street, Burwood. The house is now listed on the New South Wales State Heritage Register. Its design is an ornately idiosyncratic version of the architecture of the Federation period. The complexity of the multi-gabled roof line makes the house a landmark in the district. It contains a ballroom, and has separate stables and a fernery on its original curtilage. In 1908 he started doing design work for Arnott's Biscuits. He built four brick cottages next to the factory at Homebush and extensive brick stabling and wagon-sheds.

== Marriage ==
Rickard married Ruby Charlotte Chaseling (1887–1965) on 2 March 1912 at Wesley Church, Redfern. At the wedding reception Rickard presented his new wife with the deeds to a new home in Strathfield. In September 1923, Ruby Rickard petitioned for divorce on the ground of desertion due to non-compliance to an order for restitution of conjugal rights. He later married Ruth McCracken in the USA.

== War service ==
Rickard enlisted in Sydney on 1 February 1916 in the Army Service Corps. He embarked from Sydney on 4 May the same year and served for four years in France with the First Australian Imperial Force. After the armistice he studied to become an associate of the Royal Institute of British Architects and returned to Australia via America at his own expense. He disembarked in Sydney on 10 April 1920 and was discharged from the army on 11 June 1920.

== Los Angeles ==
After his demobilization he practised architecture in Los Angeles. In California Rickard designed homes, flats, shops and theatres and remained for 14 years before returning to Australia in 1935. In 1930 he was the architect and builder of the Dreyer residence at 816 Via Somonte, Malaga Cove, Palos Verdes Estates, California.

== Later architecture ==
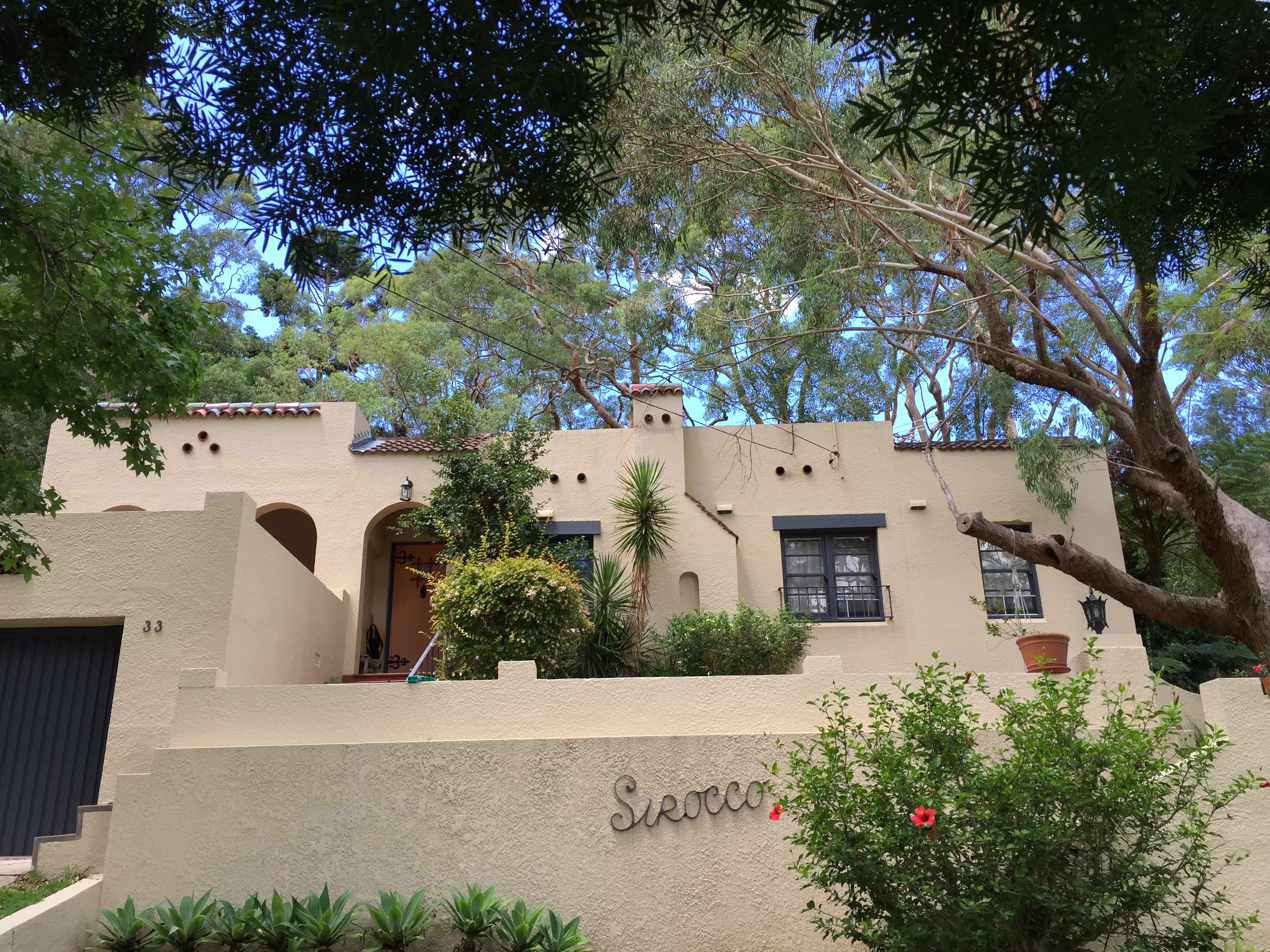
Sirocco Roseville 1938

On his return from America, Rickard resumed his architectural practise in Sydney. In 1938 he designed the Spanish Mission style house, Sirocco, in Roseville. The house, showing the influence of his time in California, is now heritage-listed. He also designed the English-style cottage next door. Santa Barbara, in Pymble, is attributed to Rickard and shows his Californian influence.

== Notable citizen ==
Rickard was profiled in the publication Notable Citizens of Sydney 1940. The book has a photo and caricature of each person together with a profile, including their vocation, birth, education, hobbies, recreations, address and special features. It marks his hobbies as being philately and his recreations as tennis and fishing. Rickard is listed as being a member of the Millions Club and the Commercial Travellers Association.
