= Clair Van Lynden =

American composer and publisher

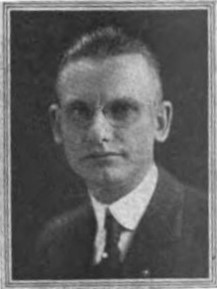
Portrait of composer and music publisher Lynden S. Buchanan

Clair Van Lynden (1885–1947) was an American 20th century composer of novelty and popular songs during the latter half of the Ragtime era. 'Clair Van Lynden' was the nom-de-plume of music publisher, Lynden St. Clair Buchanan, co-founder of the "Buck & Lowney Music Publishing Company" of St. Louis, Missouri.

== Early life ==
Lynden St. Clair Buchanan was born on March 2, 1885 in Peoria, Illinois to William H.S. and Lydia A. Buchanan. Little is known about Buchanan's upbringing, or early musical training. His Father, William, was an express messenger in the 19th century.

Buchanan can be found living in the city of St. Louis by 1906, listed as a piano teacher.

== Buck & Lowney ==
The founding of music publisher "Buck & Lowney" can be traced to the early 1910s, during which time Lynden Buchanan was residing at 1335 Aubert Avenue in St. Louis. Benjamin Lowney was general manager and co-founder with Lynden. By 1916, Buchanan had adopted the professional name, Lynden S. Buck.

"Buck & Lowney" would become a Midwest competitor to music publishers from New York City and elsewhere by the mid-1910s. This firm would debut new songs by contracting with travelling theatrical singers and European vocalists, and would also make a name for itself as a major publisher of ragtime music. It is also credited with promoting the music of songwriters Richard A. Whiting, Clarence E. Brandon Sr., Doc Cooke, Earl Haubrich, Art Gillham and J. Fred Lawton. "Buck & Lowney" was headquartered in the Holland Building, formerly located at 211 North 7th Street, St. Louis. It later established offices in New York, led by Lucien Denni, San Francisco and Chicago. In 1920, "Buck & Lowney" was reported by the New York Dramatic Mirror to merge with other major music publishers into a single firm, but this did not occur.

== Composer ==
After 1913, Lynden S. Buck would publish his own compositions through the firm under the pseudonym, 'Clair Van Lynden', possibly a Dutch-sounding reference to the forenamed headquarters, the Holland Building. Lynden published all known compositions after 1911 in St. Louis through Buck & Lowney.

His composition, "In Holland" waltzes, was in use as a silent film accompaniment piece by 1915. A number of Lynden's compositions became popular film accompaniment pieces, including his "Slumberland" waltzes. Similarly, Lynden's composition, "Snow Bird: Indian Characterstücke", was named for the main character 'Little Snowbird' in the 1916 film, The Lure of Heart's Desire. "Snow Bird" was introduced in 1916, with lyrics written by Theodore B. White. This song was featured by Billboard magazine, and was issued on piano rolls by the Herbert Co. By the late 1910s, "Snow Bird" was being performed in various settings in the United States. Sheet music for "Snow Bird" was sold into 1923 by Sears, Roebuck stores.

Lynden's most notable collaboration was with composer Earl Haubrich on the 1915 ballad song, "Someone Remembers Though the World Forgets". It was featured by The Billboard in November 1915, and one of its first advertised performances was for a dance in February 1916 in St. Louis.

Lynden's work has previously been incorrectly classified by the IMSLP as that of a female composer.

== Later ventures ==
In 1920, Lynden Buchanan advertised a short-lived composer-for-hire business in St. Louis called 'Clair Van Lynden Studios', writing music for lyricists. One year later, he could be found with the 'Buchanan Sales Company'.

Prior to 1923, Buchanan co-founded the Fay-Buchanan Music Company, a piano and instrument wholesale business, with his brother William H. Buchanan and Earl E. Fay. Buchanan had previously been employed by the Bollman Piano Co. In 1923, his company was assigned as the South and Midwest distributor for the Connorized Music Company, a New York piano roll manufacturer. It also distributed Gennett records and Starr brand phonographs.

== Death and legacy ==
Lynden S. Buchanan died May 24, 1947 in St. Louis. As well as contributing to the promotion of various authors of ragtime music during his lifetime, Buchanan's composition, "Someone Remembers Though the World Forgets", was revived on the internet by singer-songwriter Elliott Adkins in 2024.

== Compositions ==
- Sir Knight (1910), march and two-step
- Garden of Hearts waltzes (1911), as L. Buck, Lynn Music Co.
- Violets and You (1911), lyrics by Clarence E. Brandon
- Violets and You, Sweetheart (1912), re-published by Buck & Lowney
- Eastern Star: Reverie (1912)
- In Holland waltzes (1915), as Clair Van Lynden, dedicated to Queen Wilhelmina of the Netherlands
- Someone Remembers Though the World Forgets (1915), words by Sylvester Maguire
- Slumberland waltzes (1916)
- Snow Bird: Indian Characterstücke (1916)
- Lullaby (1916), arr. Gus Guentzel for violin
- Angel Chil' (1918), words by Sylvester Maguire
- My Rose of Yesterday (1918), words by Sylvester Maguire
- I Am 100% American, Are You? (1918), as L. St. Clair, lyrics by Bernice Bateman
- Rainbow Dreams: A Ballad (1919), lyrics by Marion Phelps
