= Aernout van Lynden =

Dutch-British journalist

Carel Diederic Aernout baron van Lynden (born 31 December 1954) is a Dutch-British journalist with over twenty years experience as a war correspondent in the Middle East, Northern Ireland and the Balkans.

== Career ==
Lynden began his journalism career in 1979 at the Haagsche Courant. In September 1980 he was one of the few Western journalists in Iraq when Saddam Hussein's attack on Iran opened. After this he worked as a freelance for BBC Radio, The Observer and The Washington Post. He then invested much time and energy in the anti- Soviet Resistance in Afghanistan. In 1982 he became The Observer correspondent in Beirut, where he was a journalist covering the civil war in Lebanon and other regional conflicts.

After moving to London he became involved in setting up the 24-hour news channel BSkyB. He would remain active over thirteen years. First as an anchor (presenter) and then as a senior foreign correspondent. In that role he covered among others the Soviet retreat from Afghanistan, the Romanian Revolution in 1989, the Gulf War in 1990–91, the disintegration of Yugoslavia and the Palestinian Intifada. For his reporting on the war in Bosnia in 1993, he received two international awards. From 2002 to mid-2008 he was professor of communication and journalism associated with the American University in Bulgaria (AUBG) in Blagoevgrad. He has also lectured at the John Cabot University in Rome, Italy, but is now a lecturer at Leiden University College The Hague.

Aernout van Lynden had a cameo as himself in the movie Behind Enemy Lines.

== Private life ==
Aernout van Lynden was married to diplomat Henriette van Lynden-Leijten, who died in November 2010.
