= Lynton Rowlands =

Australian cricketer (born 1961)

Personal information
- Full name: Lynton Geoffrey Rowlands
- Born: 19 January 1961 (age 65); Ulverstone, Tasmania, Australia
- Batting: Left-handed

Domestic team information
- Years: Team
- 1985/86: Tasmania

Career statistics
Competition	List A
Matches	1
Runs scored	5
Batting average	5.00
100s/50s	–/–
Top score	5
Balls bowled	–
Wickets	–
Bowling average	–
5 wickets in innings	–
10 wickets in match	–
Best bowling	–
Catches/stumpings	–/–
- Source: Cricinfo, 2 January 2011

Lynton Geoffrey Rowlands (born 19 January 1961) was an Australian cricket player, who played List A cricket for Tasmania.

== See also ==
- List of Tasmanian representative cricketers
