= Lynton (surname) =

Lynton is a surname, and may refer to:

- Holly Lynton (born 1972), American photographer
- Michael Lynton (born 1960), American businessperson
- Norbert Lynton (1927–2007), British art historian
- Thomas de Lynton (fl.1380s), English priest, Canon of Windsor

== See also ==
- Lyndon (surname)
- Linton (surname)
