= Lynton, Burwood =

Lynton
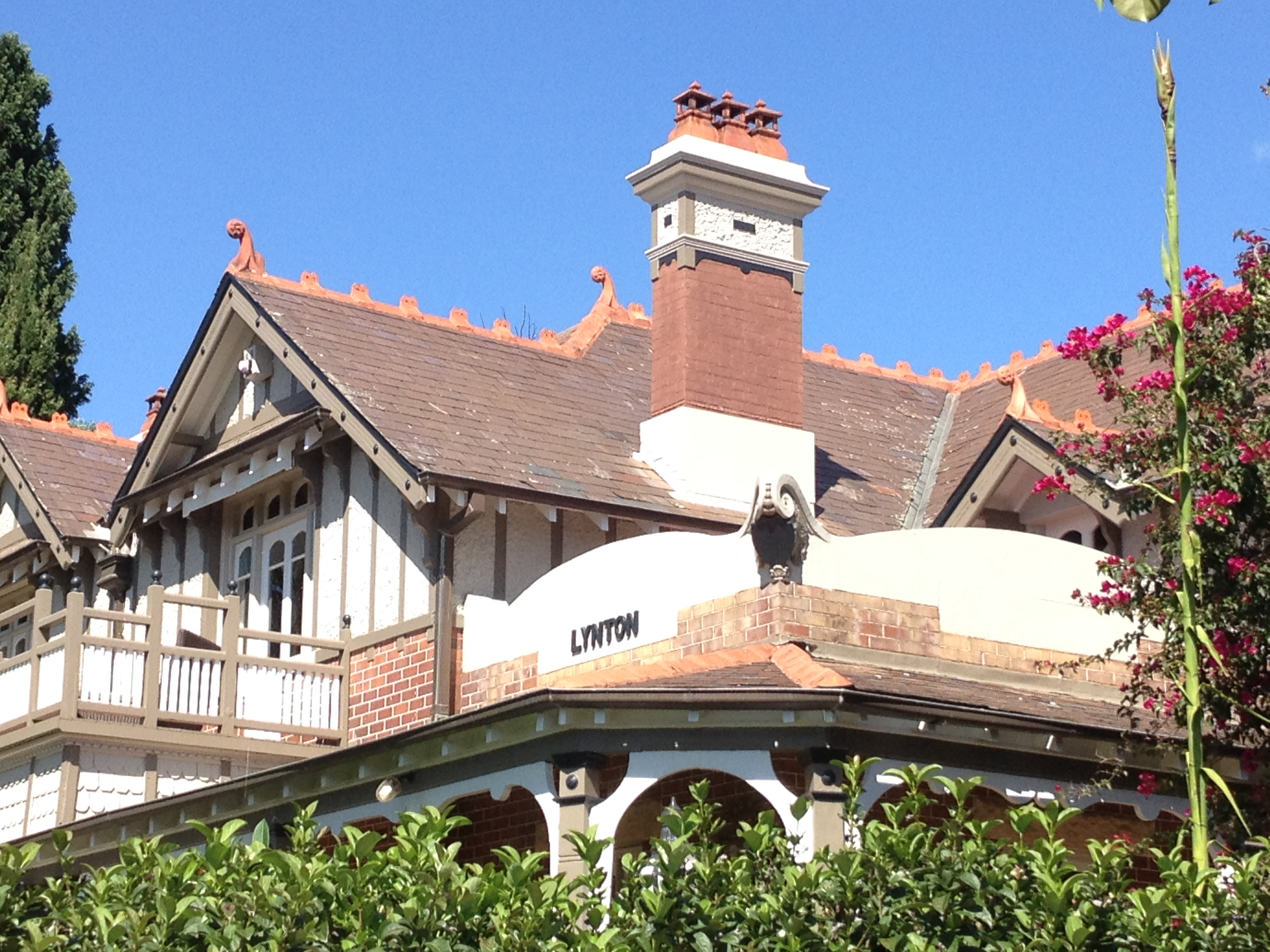
- Lynton, pictured in April 2014.

- Location within Sydney Location within Australia
- 33°52′51″S 151°06′19″E
- Location: 4 Clarence Street, Burwood, Municipality of Burwood, New South Wales, Australia

History
- Built: 1906–

Site notes
- Architect: Stanley Rickard
- Architectural style: Federation

New South Wales Heritage Register
- Official name: Lynton
- Type: State heritage (built)
- Designated: 2 April 1999
- Reference no.: 284
- Type: House
- Category: Residential buildings (private)

Lynton is a heritage-listed residence located at 4 Clarence Street in the Sydney suburb of Burwood in the Municipality of Burwood local government area of New South Wales, Australia. It was designed by Stanley Rickard and built from 1906. It was added to the New South Wales State Heritage Register on 2 April 1999.

== History ==
=== Burwood ===
Parramatta Road was first created in 1791, a vital land (cf water) artery between Sydney Cove and Rose Hill's settlement and crops. Liverpool Road opened in 1814 as Governor Macquarie's Great South Road. Its winding route reflects pre-existing land grant boundaries. To Burwood's north over Parramatta Road was Longbottom Government Farm, staffed by convicts. This grew to over 283 hectares (700 acres) on heavily timbered flat, sloping to swamps on Hen & Chicken Bay. Commissioner Bigge recorded how valuable timber (ironbark) was cut and sawn on the spot, conveyed to Sydney in boats by the river. "Charcoal for the forges and foundries is likewise prepared here" he noted.

Two land grants were critical on Burwood's clay: Captain Thomas Rowley's Burwood Farm estate and William Faithful's 405-hectare (1,000-acre) grant to its south in Enfield covered most of modern Burwood. Rowley, adjutant of the NSW Corps, named it after the farm he'd lived on in Cornwall. 1799 and subsequent grants brought it to 304 hectares (750 acres) but he continued to live at Kingston Farm in Newtown until his death in 1806. He had bought some of the first Spanish merinos brought from the Cape Colony in 1797, others being sold to Macarthur, Marsden & Cox. The southern boundary of his farm was approximately Woodside Avenue & Fitzroy Street.

Under Rowley's will, the estate passed to his three underage children - executors Dr Harris & Major Johnstone were both involved in the 1808 Bligh rebellion and returned to England for the court martial. Governor Macquarie appointed Thomas Moore as guardian and executor. In 1812, he wrongfully auctioned the estate. It was bought by Sydney businessman Alexander Riley. He is believed to have built Burwood Villa in 1814 (perhaps on older (1797) foundations of Rowley's shepherd's cottage) and lived here until departing for England in 1817. In 1824, Joseph Lycett described the estate. 202 hectares (500 acres) had been cleared for pasture. Lycett in Views of Australia described "a garden of 4 acres in full cultivation, containing upwards of three hundred Trees, bearing the following choice fruits, viz. The Orange, Citron, Lemon, Pomegranate, Loquat, Guava, Peaches, Nectarines, Apricots, Apples, Pears, the Cherry, Plums, Figs, Chestnuts, Almonds, Medlars, Quinces; with abundance of Raspberries, Strawberries, and the finest Melons. &c;".

Until the 1830s Burwood consisted of a few inns along the highways and two or three huge, undeveloped estates within the next 20 years these began to break up, attracting settlers and encouraging the growth of embryo villages at Burwood & Enfield. Riley died in 1833 and Rowley's children, now of age, started legal proceedings and regained possession of the 304-hectare (750-acre) estate. It was divided between Thomas Jr., John, John Lucas* and Henry Biggs. Almost at once they subdivided it into lots of 1.6–8.1 hectares (4–20 acres) for country homes and small farms. In 1834 the Burwood estate was held by John Lucas, husband of Thomas's daughter Mary Rowley, who divided 46 hectares (113 acres) of his 86 hectares (213 acres) into small allotments for sale. Streets such as Webb, Lucas Road, Wentworth Road, & Strathfield's The Boulevarde reflect the boundaries of these subdivisions/estates.

To the south (including the land later the Appian Way) was William Faithful's grant of 405 hectares (1,000 acres) (1808) at "Liberty Plains". Faithful was a private in the NSW Corps: discharged in 1799 he became Captain Foveaux's farm manager, and this connection got him the grant. Apart from 6 hectares (15 acres) of Sarah Nelson's on Malvern Hill (Croydon), Faithful's Farm extended from Rowley's farm to Cooks River and west to Punchbowl Road. The government retained a right to build a road through it (doing so in 1815: Liverpool or the Great South Road), and to cut "such timber as may be deemed fit for naval purposes" - the area was thick with tall ironbark. Faithful exchanged it in 1815. Alexander Riley bought his 81 hectares (200 acres) north of the new road incorporating it into his Burwood estate. This was jointly owned by the Rowley family after 1833 and had no streets across it, only a few tracks.

Despite opening up of the Rowley estate, there was little settlement in Burwood between the two highways before 1860. Sydney Railway Company opened the first rail to Parramatta in 1855. Burwood "station" (just west of Ashfield station, one of the first stations) was a wooden platform near a level crossing over the grassy track that was Neich's Lane* (later Burwood Road). This was beside "the newly laid out township of Cheltenham". Speedy transport meant subdivision and consolidation followed, filling out the area. Burwood's biggest growth spurt was between 1874 and 1900 (Burwood's population was, respectively: 1200–7400, an increase not matched since). *1835 maps show this as the only track between Parramatta / Liverpool Roads in Burwood.

Burwood's first public school appeared in c. 1838. In 1843, land on Burwood Road was granted to the Anglican Church for a school. St. Mary's Catholic Church opened in 1846, a Presbyterian Church, in 1857 and St. Paul's Anglican, in 1871. Mansions of the 1870s+ such as The Priory were due to a firm belief in its health-giving climate, compared to the smog and crowding of the city suburbs. They were built as quasi-ancestral estates, perhaps in blissful ignorance of how quickly suburbs can evolve. Living was primitive: no street lighting (1883+), home lighting by candle or lamp (oil, kerosene after 1860), no gas (1882+), no piped water (1886+), home wells and tanks, few bathrooms, no indoor toilets, with pans (1880+) replacing outdoor cess pits.

The 1880s+ was the era of the debates that led to Australia's fractious states combining into a single Federation, declared at Sydney's Centennial Park in 1901. Skilled tradesmen and materials were plentiful and comparatively cheap, and combined with the improvement in building techniques associated with cavity walls, damp-courses and terracotta tiled roofs, provided the means for an era of intense building activity. Unlike the Victorian era's large commercial and Government building, the main thrust of the Federation era was constructing new suburbs around Sydney harbour with shops for the middle classes.

Between 1889 and 1918 Australia's population swelled from 3 to 5 million triggering an urgent need for housing. Suburban spread was greatly assisted by expansion of the public transport system of trams, ferries and trams, which formed a well-integrated pre-car transport system. Rapid suburban growth brought increased interest in town planning and the British concept (Ebenezer Howard's 'Garden City') of the Garden Suburb, spurred on by the Federal Capital Competition of 1912. 1913's arrival from North America of winners, Walter Burley & Marion Mahony Griffin, saw formation of the Town Planning Association of New South Wales, with architect John Sulman as president. Founding members Sulman and J. P. Fitzgerald were among witnesses at the 1900 Royal Commission into the Improvement of the City of Sydney and suburbs. This made the first attempt at a comprehensive review of Sydney's problems, gathering many reform ideas. It recognised the relationship between planning and local government and advocated introduction of a town planning bill along the lines of John Burns' 1900 English Bill. Some recommendations, such as introducing building regulations for the whole metropolitan area "to prevent the straggling of suburbs and to ensure development along harmonious lines" went into 1919's Local Government Act.

The "Garden Suburb" came to mean a suburb with special areas zoned for different uses, e.g.: residential and commercial; an absence of attached terraces with free-standing houses, wide tree-lined streets, "nature strips" on footpaths, parks reserves and gardens. Much-derided rear lanes and rights-of-way became redundant with sewerage and the provision of side access between houses. Verandas and bay windows were means of integrating house & garden.

Tree-lined streets such as Burwood Rd., The Appian Way or The Boulevard in Strathfield were in marked contrast to most development in Australian cities of the late 19th century.

=== Lynton ===
Lynton was designed for Arthur Hezlett by architect Stanley Rickard in 1906.

The Burwood Historical Society and the National Trust of Australia (N.S.W) nominated a group of Federation houses in Burwood for protection under the Heritage Act in 1981. An Interim Conservation Order was placed on the heritage precinct on 20 November 1981. This nomination came into being principally because Lynton exhibited similar features to a fine collection of Federation-style mansions that formed a coherent and well preserved streetscape.

There were initially five houses protected in the precinct, all of Federation design. It was agreed that the order should be allowed to expire on the precinct as the area would be protected under a local environment plan, but that Lynton one of the most outstanding buildings should be protected by a Permanent Conservation Order.

When Lynton was purchased by an Alderman of Burwood in 1985, the building was converted for use as a reception centre. In the process of conversion, the removal of walls between the major rooms took place. It was at the time in derelict condition. The owner subsequently restored the house.

Lynton was listed on the State Heritage Register on 2 April 1999.

== Description ==
=== Site ===
Lynton is prominently sited on a rising ridge, set back from Clarence Street. Once there was a circular driveway in front. Note the remains of the circular rose garden and beds for annuals. Art Nouveau detailing inside and in the leadlight windows with plant imagery throughout.

(front to Clarence Street). A tall hedge of Photinia robusta planted in the 1980s screens much of a view of the house from Clarence Street but provides privacy. The entry gate has a lych gate over it, stone steps and a path to the north-western side of the house. Mature trees include a cock's comb coral tree (Erythrina crista-galli), fan palm (Washingtonia robusta) and Bhutan cypresses (Cupressus torulosa).

(Rear to Church Street), Federation-style stables with ornamental ridge-capping on roof. Note the house's wooden fretwork and verandah columns. NB: Cocos Is./Queen palms & Lord Howe Island palms.

=== House ===
An ornate and highly individual treatment of the Federation idiom, the house displays a complexity of form and materials, ranging from its multi-gabled roof line, roughcast render and leaded quarry windows, to vigorous application to flat carved timber and stone work. Its ballroom is on the right hand side of the front door.

The grandeur of this setting was quite deliberately achieved with the house capturing so well the architectural qualities of the time. The most distinctive feature of this house is its picturesque roofline.

Ornamentation was not just restricted to the roof; wood, glass and tiles were the other main modes of decoration. The influence of Art Nouveau is displayed throughout the house and can be seen in the plaster ceiling of the drawing room and entry hall. In the design of windows and doors, plants are depicted in leadlight with the vegetation, such as leaves and flowers buds, twining from the base of the design towards the top. Where a door has a fanlight and sidelight (the two main entry doors), the vegetation envelopes the door itself by twining from the base of the sidelight and making its way to the other side of the fanlight. A small parapet wall facing the street has the name Lynton inscribed on it. Stables are located to the rear of the property.

=== Modifications and dates ===
- 1985 - Converted into a reception centre in 1985 when it was derelict, it was then restored. Alterations were made to the interior, including the installation of kitchen fittings and the upgrading of the bathrooms. Modifications to the roof included the improvement of rusted gutters and downpipes. Valleys and flatroofs replaced with new copper to original.
- 1990 a lych gate was erected over the Clarence Street gate entry and cedar balconies to the first floor were reinstated.

=== Further information ===
The house has received an award from the National Trust and has won the Bicentennial Restoration Competition.

== Heritage listing ==
As at 3 October 2000, a large and unusual Federation mansion of considerable architectural interest which contributes greatly to the character of the area. The house is a local landmark, in original condition and retains its original curtilage.

Lynton was listed on the New South Wales State Heritage Register on 2 April 1999 having satisfied the following criteria.

The place is important in demonstrating the course, or pattern, of cultural or natural history in New South Wales.

Lynton was designed as an individual house set in its own garden. The house was built in Federation style giving a unity to the area not usually found in other development of the time. Lynton only represents an important period in Australian architectural and social history but, indeed, reflects the concept of the time.

The place is important in demonstrating aesthetic characteristics and/or a high degree of creative or technical achievement in New South Wales.

Lynton exhibits many of the features that are distinctive to the Federation Style. Visible is the gabled high pitched roof. Double hung and the use of leadlight and stained glass windows are also apparent. Detailed timber columns and valances range along the verandah with the motif repeated in the window hoods and the barge boards. The upper floor is set within the roof space in the form of gabled dormers. Gables are half timbered and stuccoed and the roof is slated with terracotta ridgings.

The place possesses uncommon, rare or endangered aspects of the cultural or natural history of New South Wales.

It is the only house remaining in the block on a large area of land with frontage to Clarance Street.

The place is important in demonstrating the principal characteristics of a class of cultural or natural places/environments in New South Wales.

Lynton is a distinctive example of the Federation Style. Lynton only represents an important period in Australian architectural and social history but, indeed, reflects the concept of the time.

== See also ==
- Australian residential architectural styles
