= Leiden University =

Public university in the Netherlands

- Universiteit Leiden
- Latin: Academia Lugduno-Batava
- Former name: Rijksuniversiteit Leiden
- Motto: Libertatis Praesidium (Latin)
- Motto in English: Bastion of Freedom
- Type: Public research university
- Established: 8 February 1575; 451 years ago
- Founder: William of Orange
- Academic affiliations: TPC; Una Europa
- Budget: €974 million (2024)
- President: Luc Sels
- Rector: Sarah de Rijcke
- Faculty: 2,043 (2024)
- Administrative staff: 1,573
- Students: 33,839 (2024–25)
- Undergraduates: 24,496 (2021–22)
- Postgraduates: 12,395 (2021–22)
- Doctoral students: 963 (2024)
- Location: Leiden and The Hague, South Holland, Netherlands; 52°09′25″N 4°29′07″E
- Campus: Urban and College town
- Language: Dutch, English (Additional languages for language programmes)
- Colours: University blue
- Website: universiteitleiden.nl

- Location within Netherlands Location within Europe

Leiden University (abbreviated as LEI; Dutch: Universiteit Leiden) is a public research university in Leiden, Netherlands. Established in 1575 by William, Prince of Orange as a Protestant institution, it holds the distinction of being the oldest surviving university in the Netherlands. (Note: During the period of the Habsburg Netherlands, which included the present-day Netherlands, the University of Leuven (1425–1797) was the oldest university. After the separation of the northern Netherlands, the University of Leiden (founded in 1575) became the first and oldest university in the Dutch Republic and later in its successor, the Kingdom of the Netherlands.)

The university has seven academic faculties and over fifty subject departments, housing more than forty national and international research institutes. Its historical primary campus consists of several buildings spread over Leiden, while a second campus located in The Hague houses a liberal arts college (Leiden University College The Hague) and several of its faculties. It is a member of the Coimbra Group, the Europaeum, and a founding member of the League of European Research Universities.

The university has produced twenty-six Spinoza Prize Laureates and sixteen Nobel Laureates. Members of the Dutch royal family such as Queen Juliana, Queen Beatrix, and King Willem-Alexander are alumni, and ten prime ministers of the Netherlands including Mark Rutte. US president John Quincy Adams also studied at the university.

== History ==
=== Foundation and early history ===
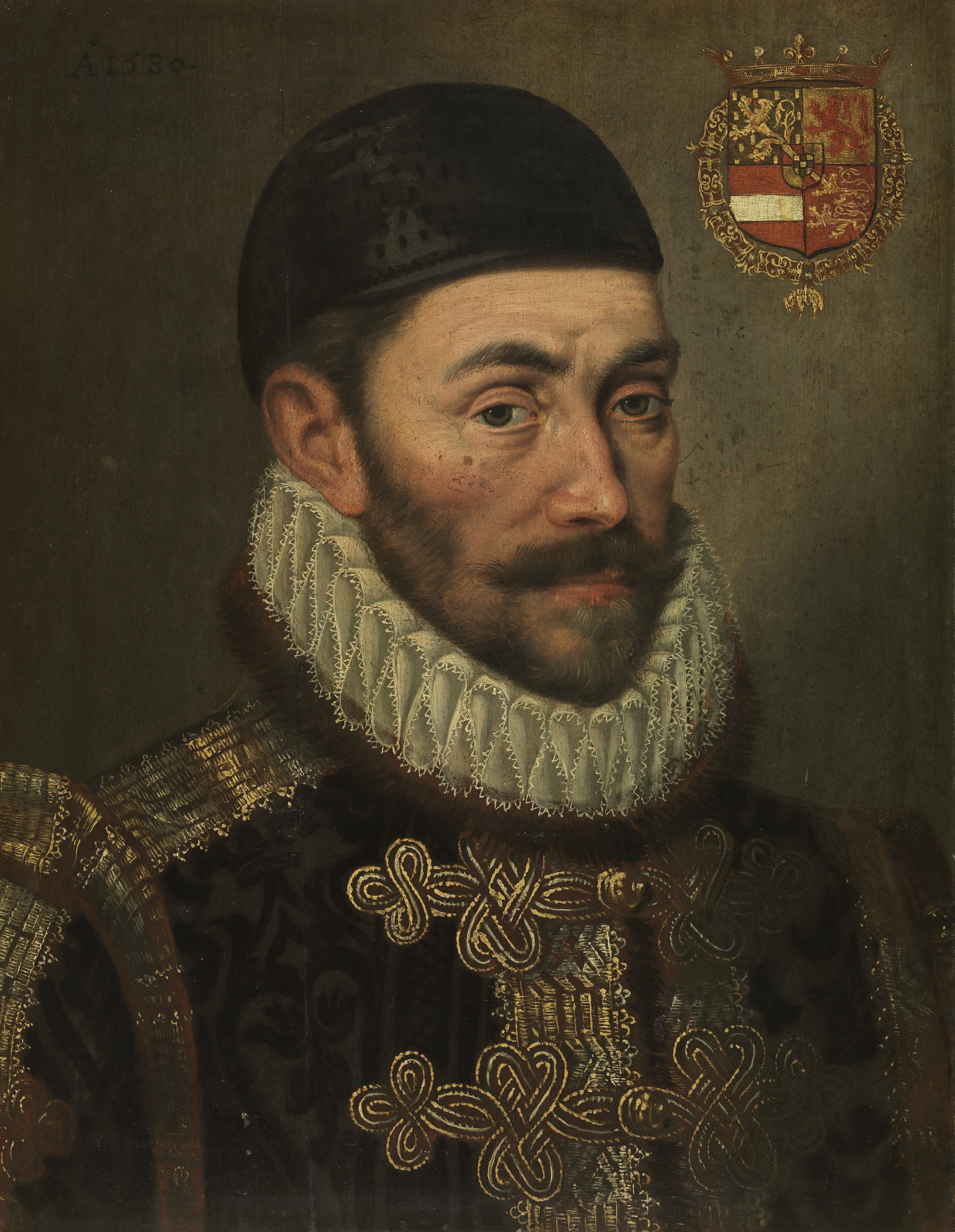
William the Silent, founder of the university, in the 16th century.

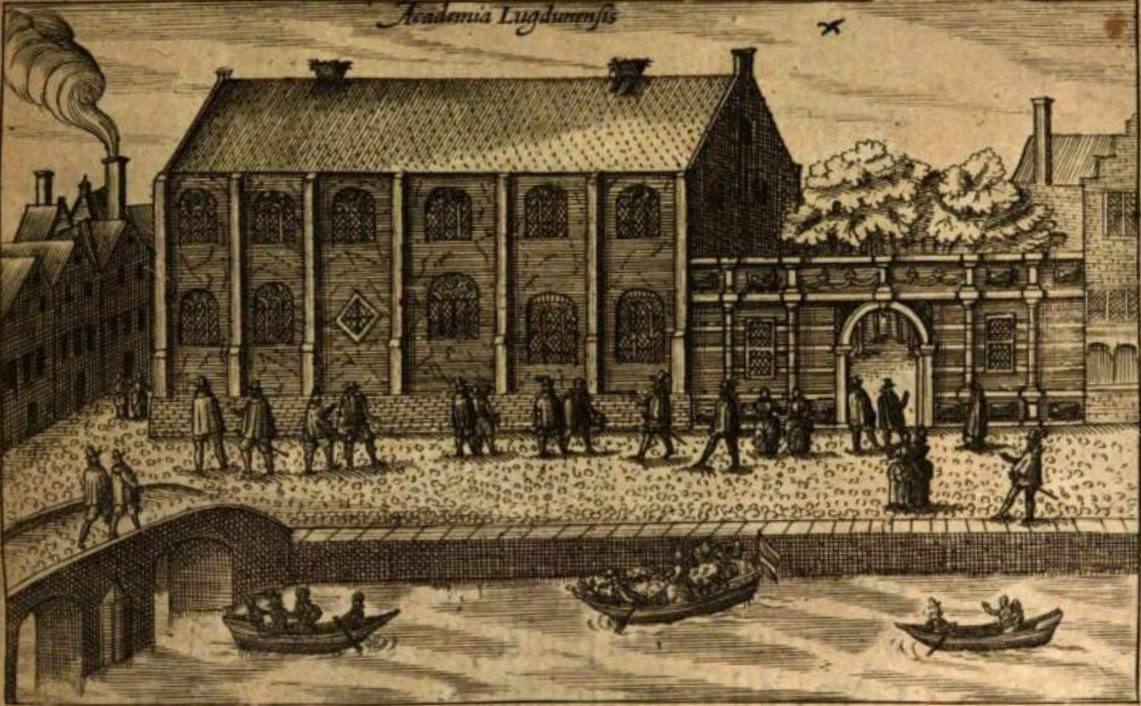
The academy building of Leiden University in 1614.

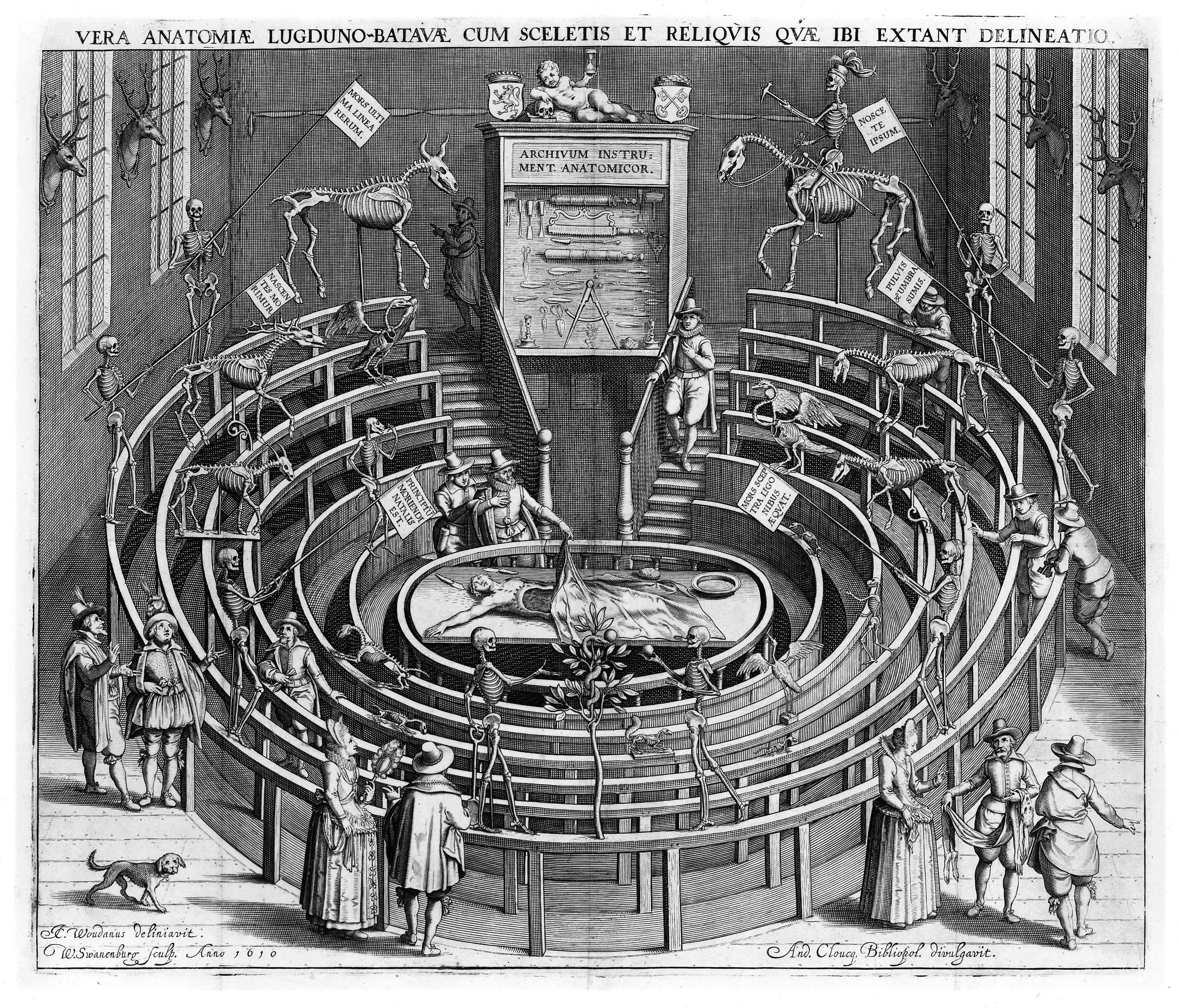
Leiden anatomical theatre

In 1575, the emerging Dutch Republic did not have universities in its northern heartland. The other universities in the Habsburg Netherlands were the University of Leuven and the University of Douai, located in an area under firm Spanish control. Prince William founded Leiden University to give the Northern Netherlands an institution that could educate its citizens in religion and provide the government with educated men in all fields. It is said the choice fell on Leiden as a reward for the heroic defence of Leiden against Spanish attacks in 1574. The name of Philip II of Spain, William's adversary, appears on the official foundation certificate as he was still the de jure count of Holland. Philip II forbade all his subjects to study in Leiden.

The new institution was initially located in the Convent of Saint Barbara, then moved to the Faliede Bagijn Church in 1577 (now the location of the university museum) and in 1581 to a former convent of Cistercian nuns, a site which it still occupies, though the original building was destroyed by a fire in 1616.

Leiden University's reputation was created in part by the presence of scholars such as Justus Lipsius, Joseph Scaliger, Franciscus Gomarus, Hugo Grotius, Jacobus Arminius, Daniel Heinsius, and Gerhard Johann Vossius within fifty years of its founding. By the 1640s, over five hundred students were enrolled from all across Europe, making it the largest Protestant university. Baruch Spinoza discovered Descartes's work partly at Leiden University, which he visited for periods of study multiple times. In the 18th century, Jacobus Gronovius, Herman Boerhaave, Tiberius Hemsterhuis, and David Ruhnken were among the renowned academics of the university.

In 1896, the Zeeman effect was discovered at the institution by Pieter Zeeman and shortly afterward explained by Hendrik Antoon Lorentz. In the world's first university low-temperature laboratory, Professor Heike Kamerlingh Onnes achieved a temperature only one degree above absolute zero. In 1908, he was also the first to succeed in liquifying helium and has played a role in the discovery of superconductivity in metals.

=== Modern day ===
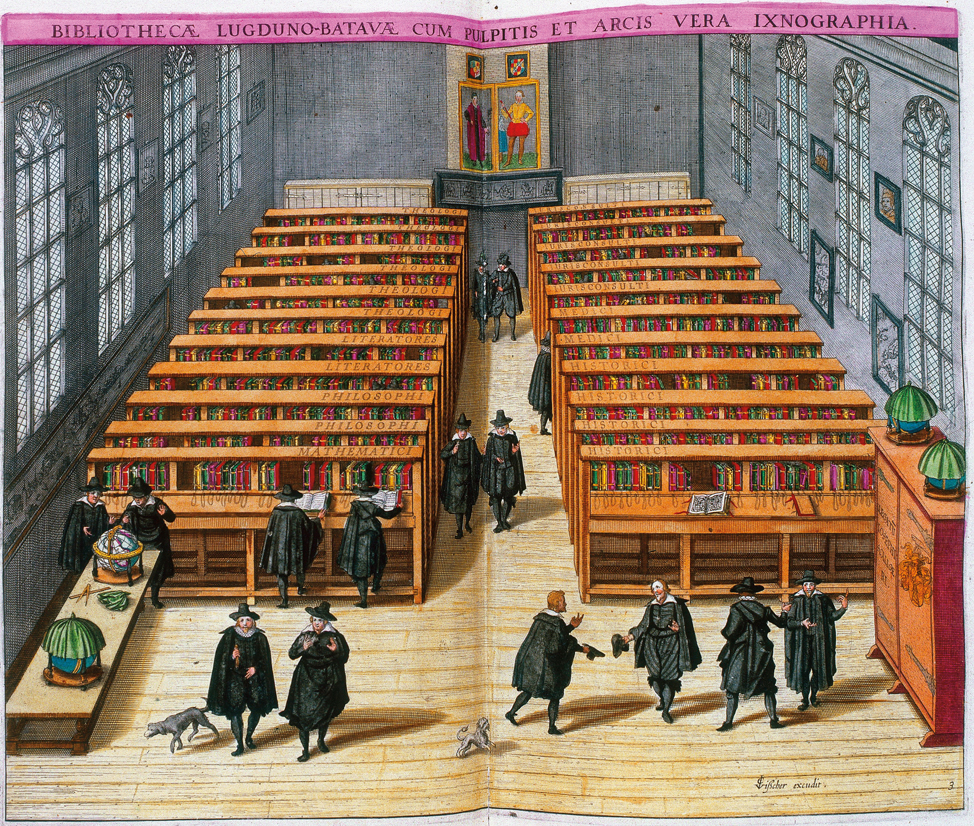
Leiden University Library in 1610

The University Library has more than 5.2 million books and fifty thousand journals. It also has collections of Western and Oriental manuscripts, printed books, archives, prints, drawings, photographs, maps, and atlases. It houses the world's largest collections on Indonesia and the Caribbean, collected by the Scaliger Institute which studies various aspects of knowledge transmissions and ideas through texts and images from antiquity to the present day. In 2005, the manuscript of Einstein on the quantum theory of the monatomic ideal gas (the Einstein-Bose condensation) was discovered in one of Leiden's libraries.

==== Partnerships ====
In 2012 Leiden entered into a strategic alliance with Delft University of Technology and Erasmus University Rotterdam for the universities to increase the quality of their research and teaching. The university is also the unofficial home of the Bilderberg Group, a meeting of high-level political and economic figures from North America and Europe. Leiden University partnered with Duke University School of Law starting in 2017 to run a joint summer program on global and transnational law from its Hague campus.

== Location and buildings ==
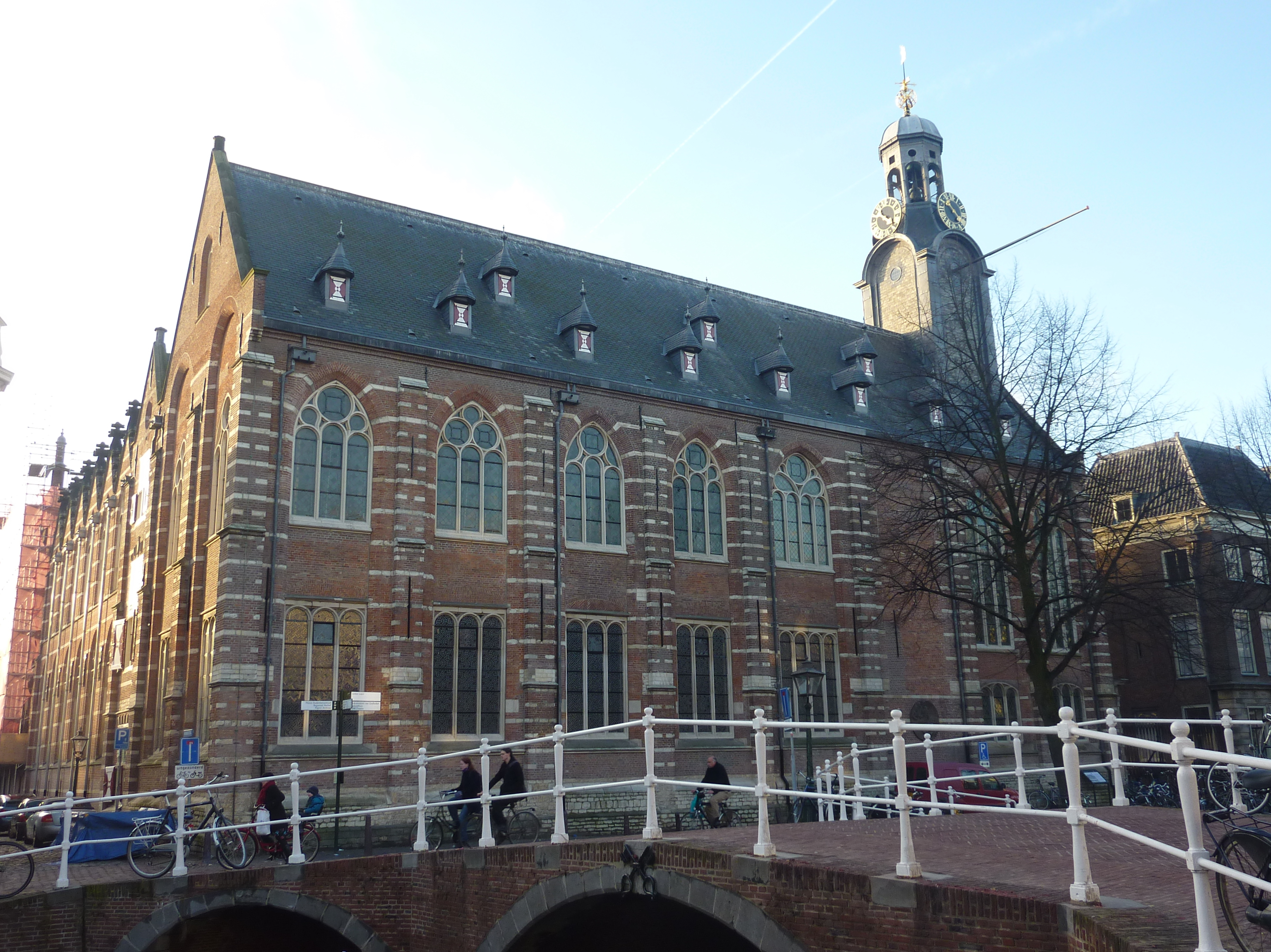
The academy building of Leiden University today

The university has no central campus; its buildings are spread over the city. Some buildings, like the Gravensteen, are very old, while Van Steenis, Lipsius and Gorlaeus are much more modern.

Among the institutions affiliated with the university are The KITLV or Royal Netherlands Institute of Southeast Asian and Caribbean Studies (founded in 1851), the Leiden Observatory 1633; the Natural History Museum, with a very complete anatomical cabinet; the Rijksmuseum van Oudheden (National Museum of Antiquities), with especially valuable Egyptian and Indian departments; a museum of Dutch antiquities from the earliest times; and three ethnographical museums, of which the nucleus was Philipp Franz von Siebold's Japanese collections. The anatomical and pathological laboratories of the university are modern, and the museums of geology and mineralogy have been restored.

The Hortus Botanicus (botanical garden) is the oldest botanical garden in the Netherlands and one of the oldest in the world. Plants from all over the world have been carefully cultivated here by experts for more than four centuries. The Clusius garden (a reconstruction), the 18th-century Orangery with its monumental tub plants, the rare collection of historical trees hundreds of years old, the Japanese Siebold Memorial Museum symbolising the historical link between East and West, the tropical greenhouses with their world-class plant collections, and the central square and Conservatory exhibiting exotic plants from South Africa and southern Europe.

=== Zweetkamertje ===
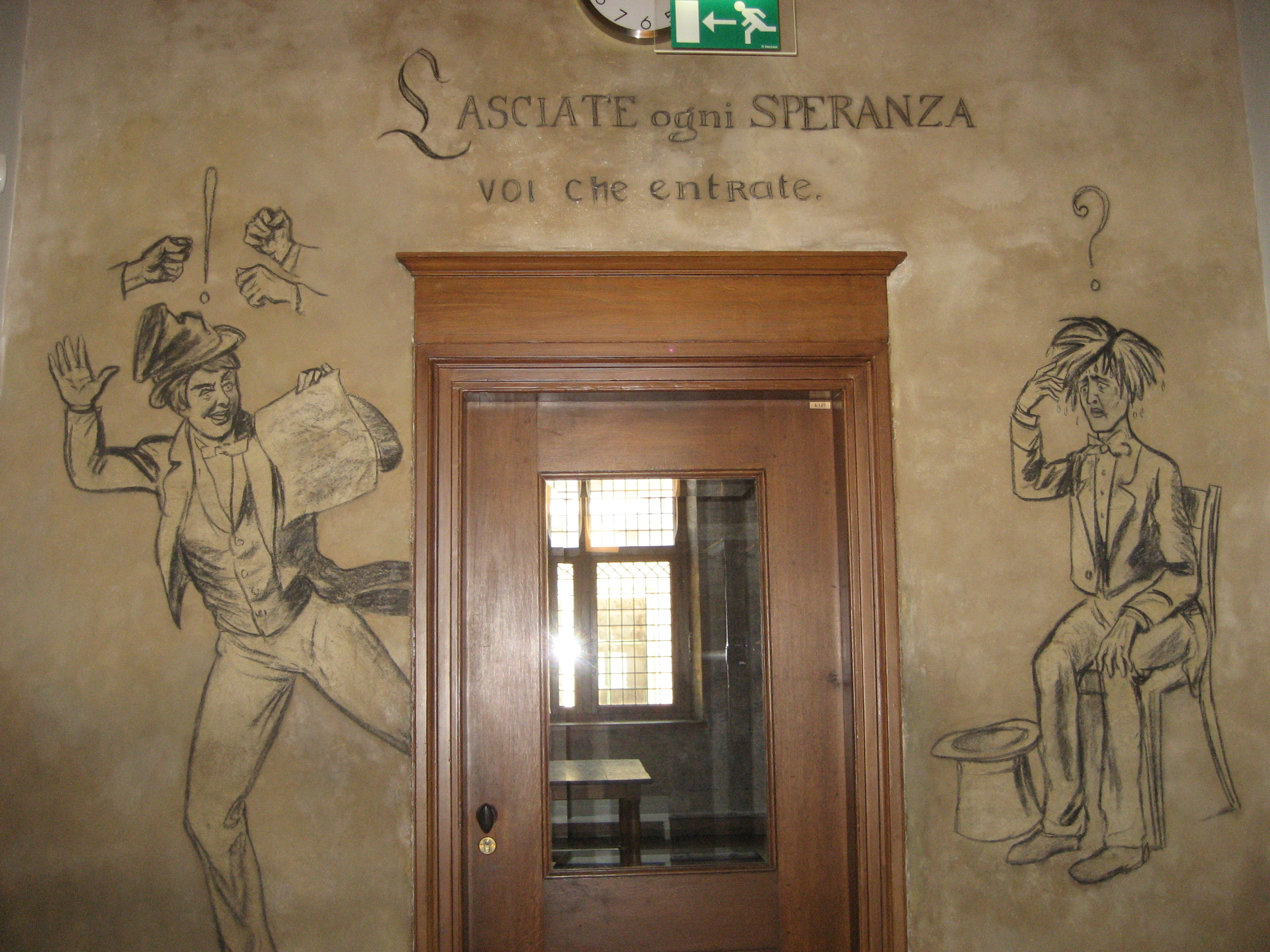

The "Sweat Room" (Dutch: Zweetkamertje) is a small chamber in the university's Academy Building, traditionally used by doctoral candidates awaiting the results of their PhD defenses. The room is renowned for its walls covered with the signatures of graduates, including notable figures such as Winston Churchill, Nelson Mandela, and members of the Dutch royal family. Originally serving as a meeting room for university curators, the Zweetkamertje became associated with doctoral examinations in the 18th century. Candidates would wait in this room before defending their dissertations, often experiencing considerable anxiety, hence the name. Over time, it became customary for successful candidates to inscribe their names on the walls as a rite of passage. While the tradition is primarily associated with doctoral candidates, all master's students are also permitted to sign the walls upon graduation, meaning that some individuals have added their names multiple times over the course of their academic careers. The tradition of signing the Zweetkamertje walls is a cherished aspect of Leiden University's heritage. The room features thousands of signatures, including those of honorary doctorate recipients. In 2014, a crowdfunding campaign successfully raised funds to restore the room's deteriorating plaster, ensuring the preservation of this unique historical record.

=== Campus The Hague ===
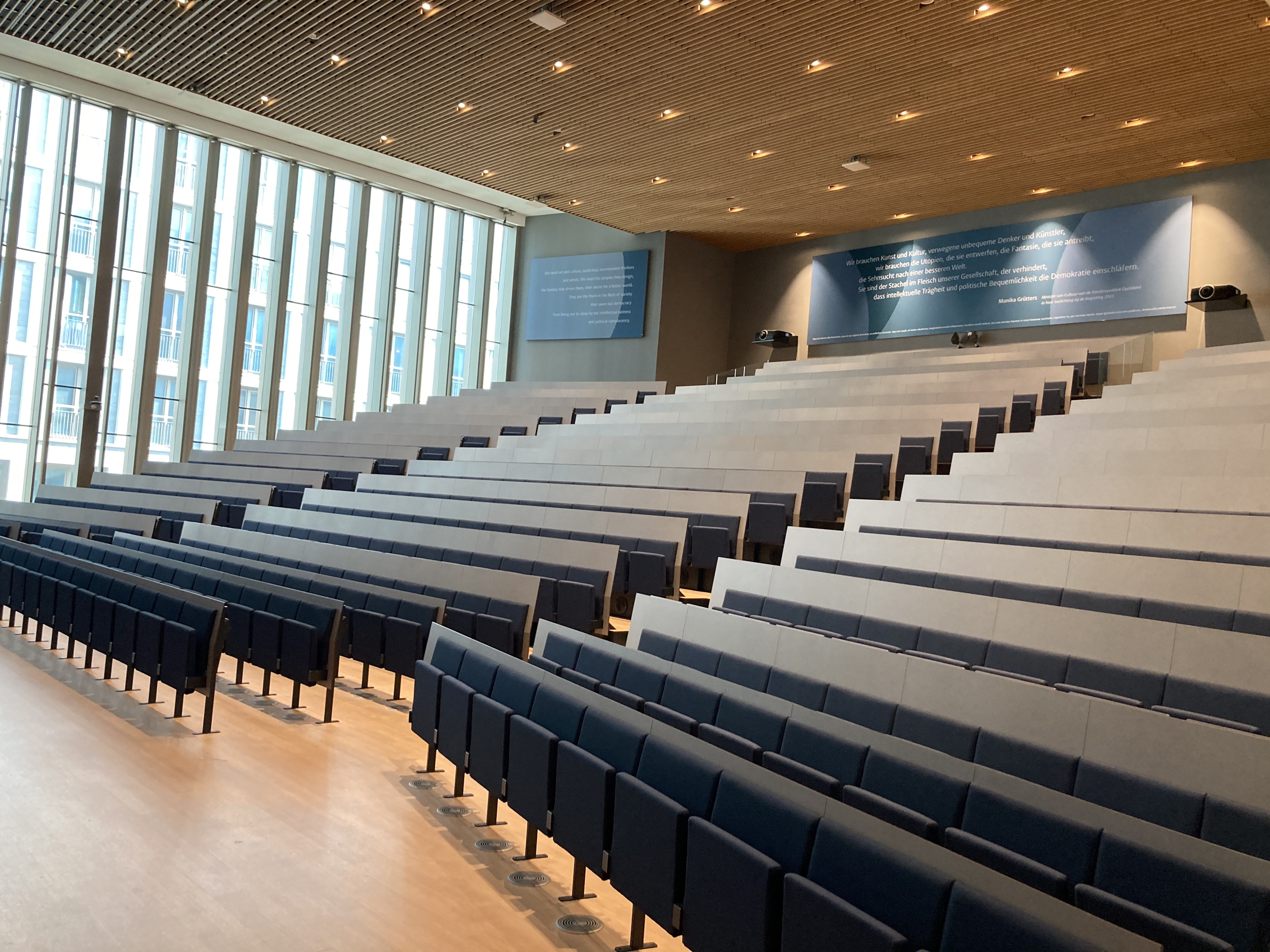
A lecture hall in the Leiden University campus in The Hague.

In 1998, the university expanded to The Hague which has become home to Campus The Hague, with six of the seven faculties represented and serving as the exclusive home of the Faculty of Governance and Global Affairs, International Studies and Leiden University College The Hague, a liberal arts and sciences college. Here, the university offers academic courses in the fields of law, political science, public administration and medicine. It occupied a number of buildings in the centre of the city, including a college building at Lange Voorhout, before moving into the new 'Wijnhaven' building on Turfmarkt in 2016.

The Faculty of Governance and Global Affairs was established in 2011, together with the University College, and one of the largest programmes of the Faculty of Humanities, International Studies.

Since 2017 Leiden University Medical Center also has a branch at Campus The Hague.

== Organisation ==
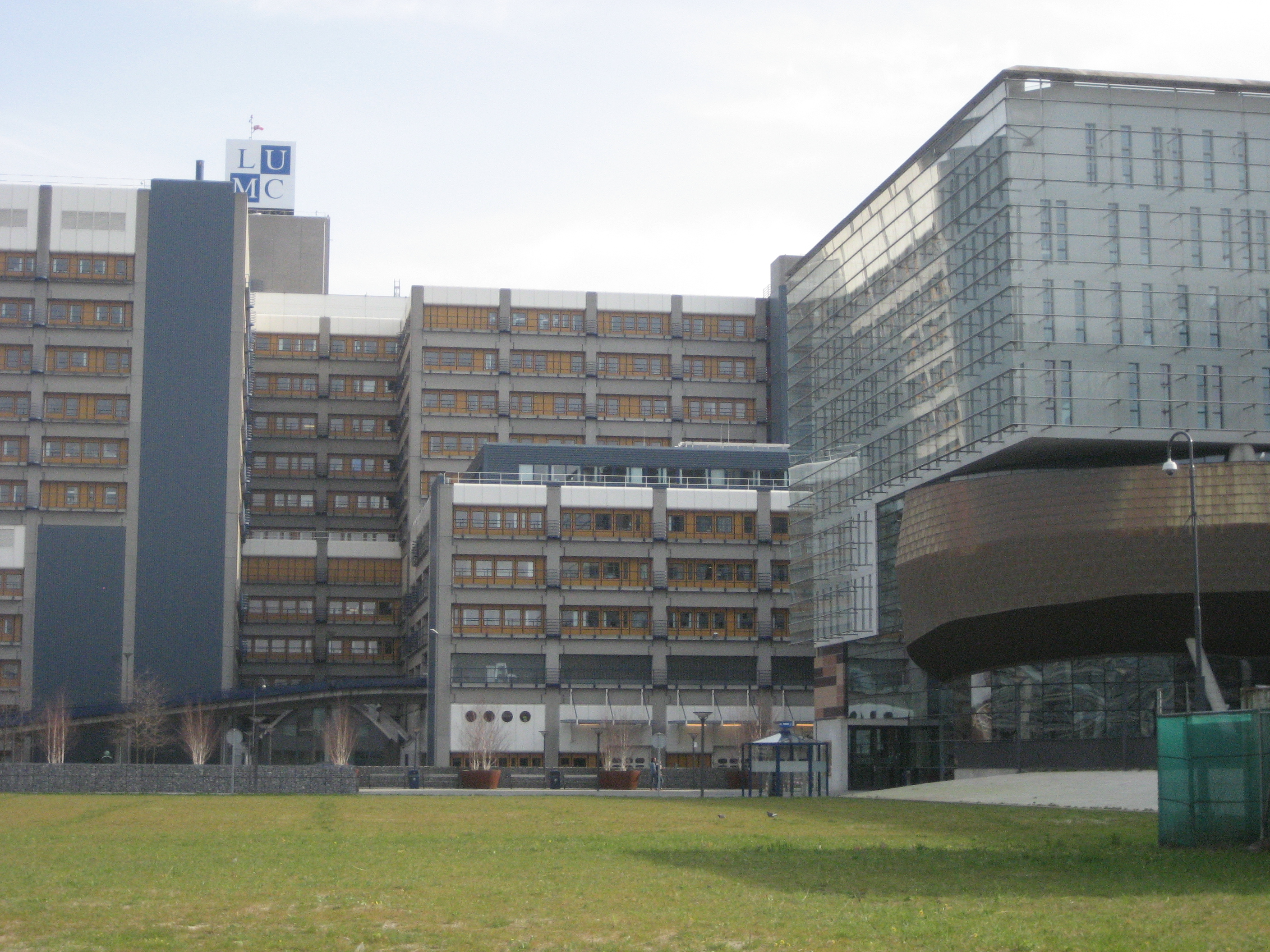
The Leiden University Medical Centre

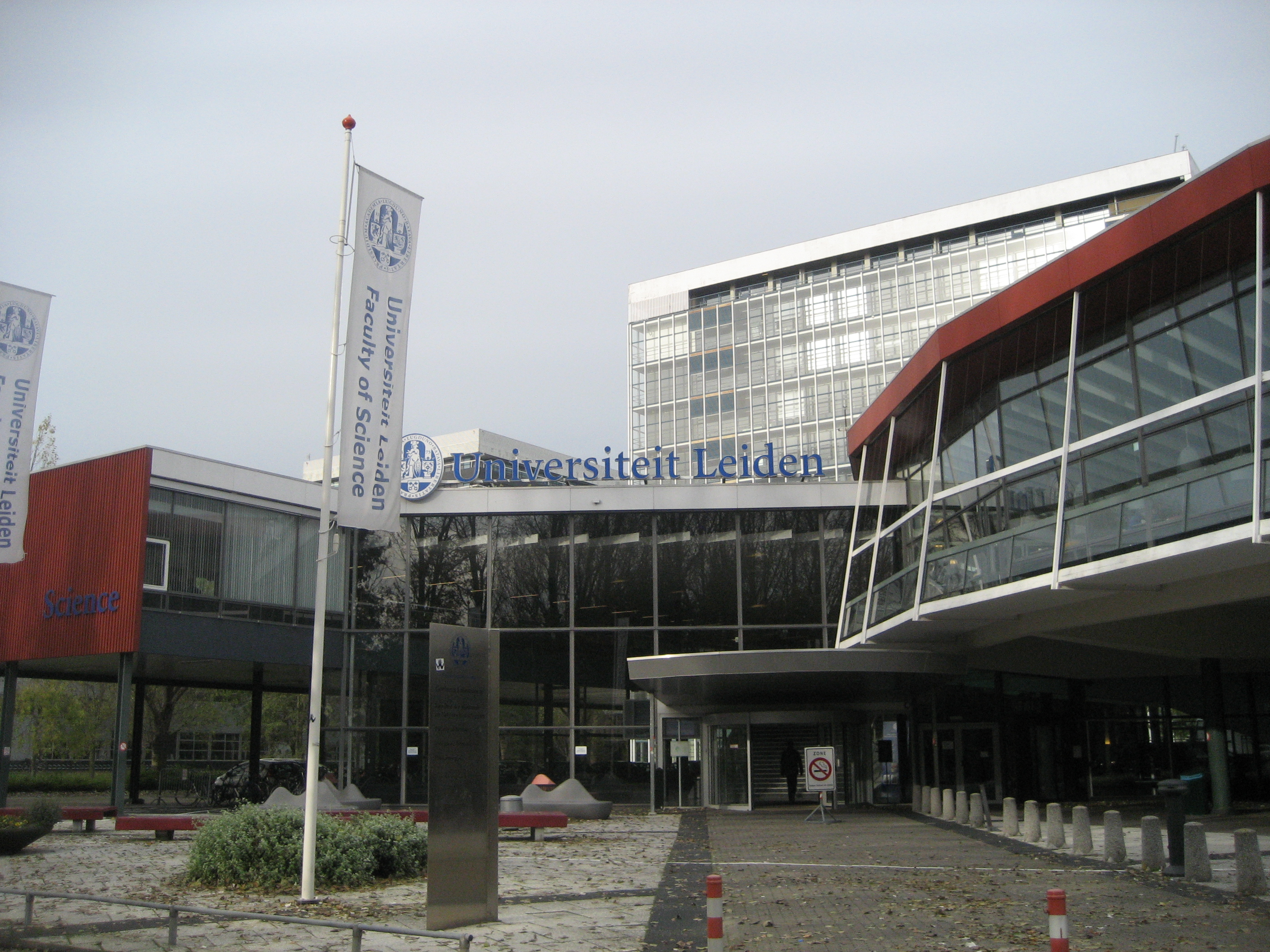
Entrance of Gorlaeus building of the Faculty of Science

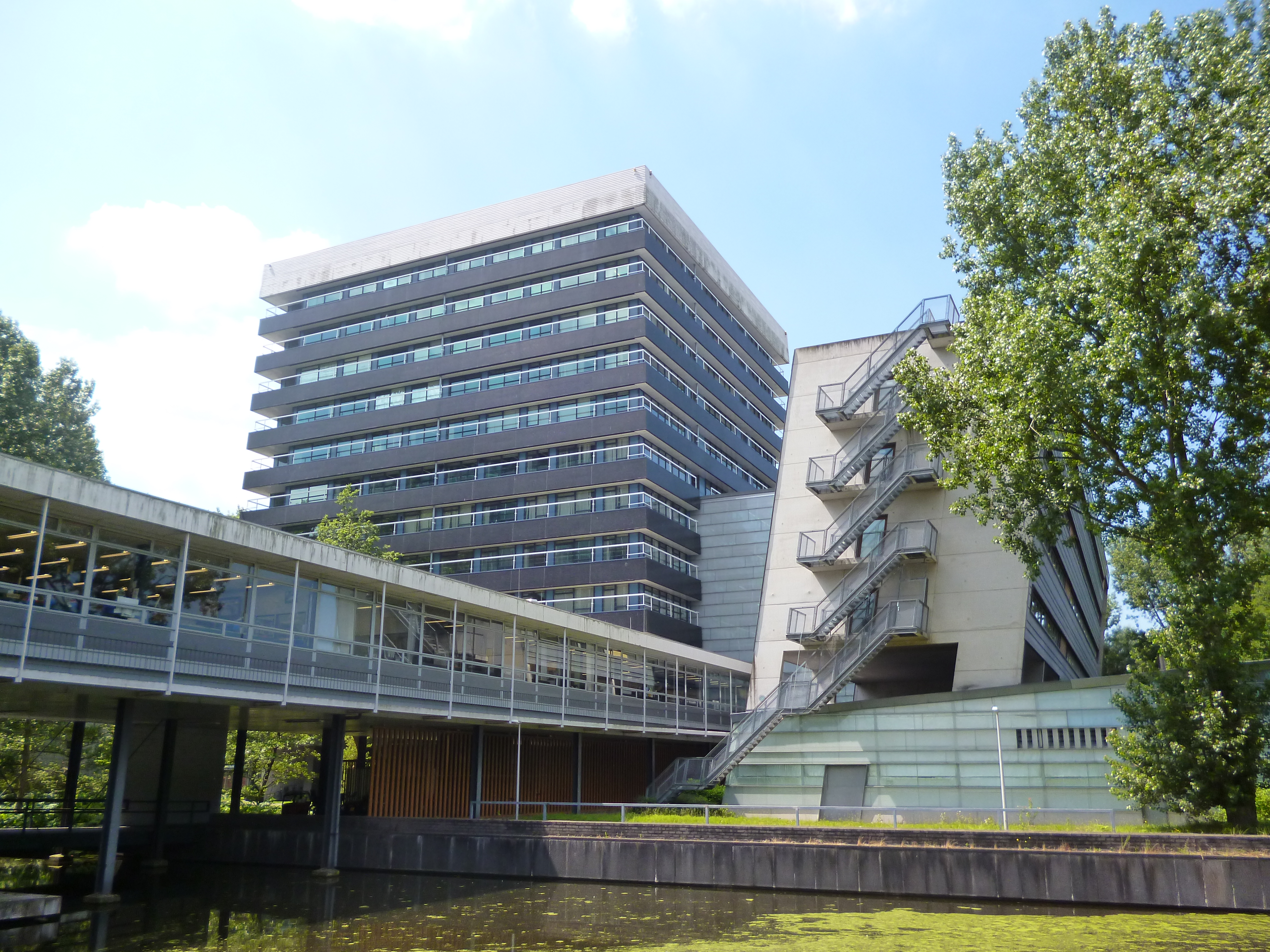
Huygens and Oort Buildings of the Faculty of Science

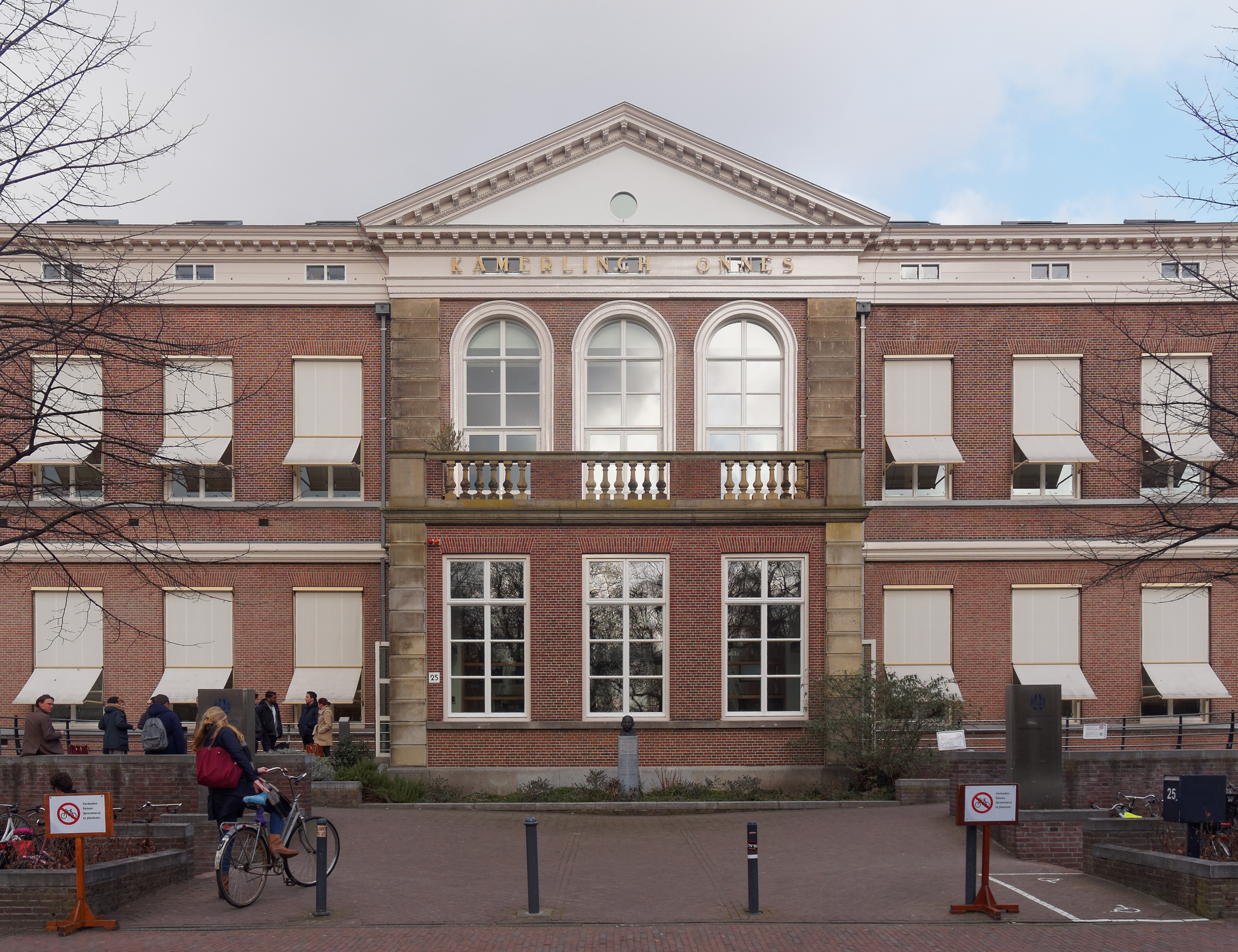
Faculty of Law, in the building that once housed Heike Kamerlingh Onnes' laboratory

The university is divided into seven major faculties which offer approximately 50 undergraduate degree programmes and over 100 graduate programmes.

- Archaeology
- Governance and Global Affairs
- Humanities
- Law
- Medicine / LUMC
- Science
- Social and Behavioural Sciences

== Academic profile ==
=== Undergraduate studies ===
Most of the university's departments offer their degree programme(s). Undergraduate programmes lead to either a B.A., B.Sc., or LL.B. degree. Other degrees, such as the B.Eng. or B.F.A., are not awarded at Leiden University.

=== Graduate studies ===
Students can choose from a range of graduate programmes. Most of the above-mentioned undergraduate programmes can be continued with either a general or a specialised graduate program. Leiden University offers more than 100 graduate programs leading to either MA, MSc, MPhil, or LLM degrees. The MPhil is the most advanced graduate degree and is awarded by select university departments (mostly in the fields of Arts, Social Sciences, Archaeology, Philosophy, and Theology). Admission to these programmes is highly selective and primarily aimed at those students opting for an academic career or before going into law or medicine. Traditionally, the MPhil degree enabled its holder to teach at the university level as an associate professor.

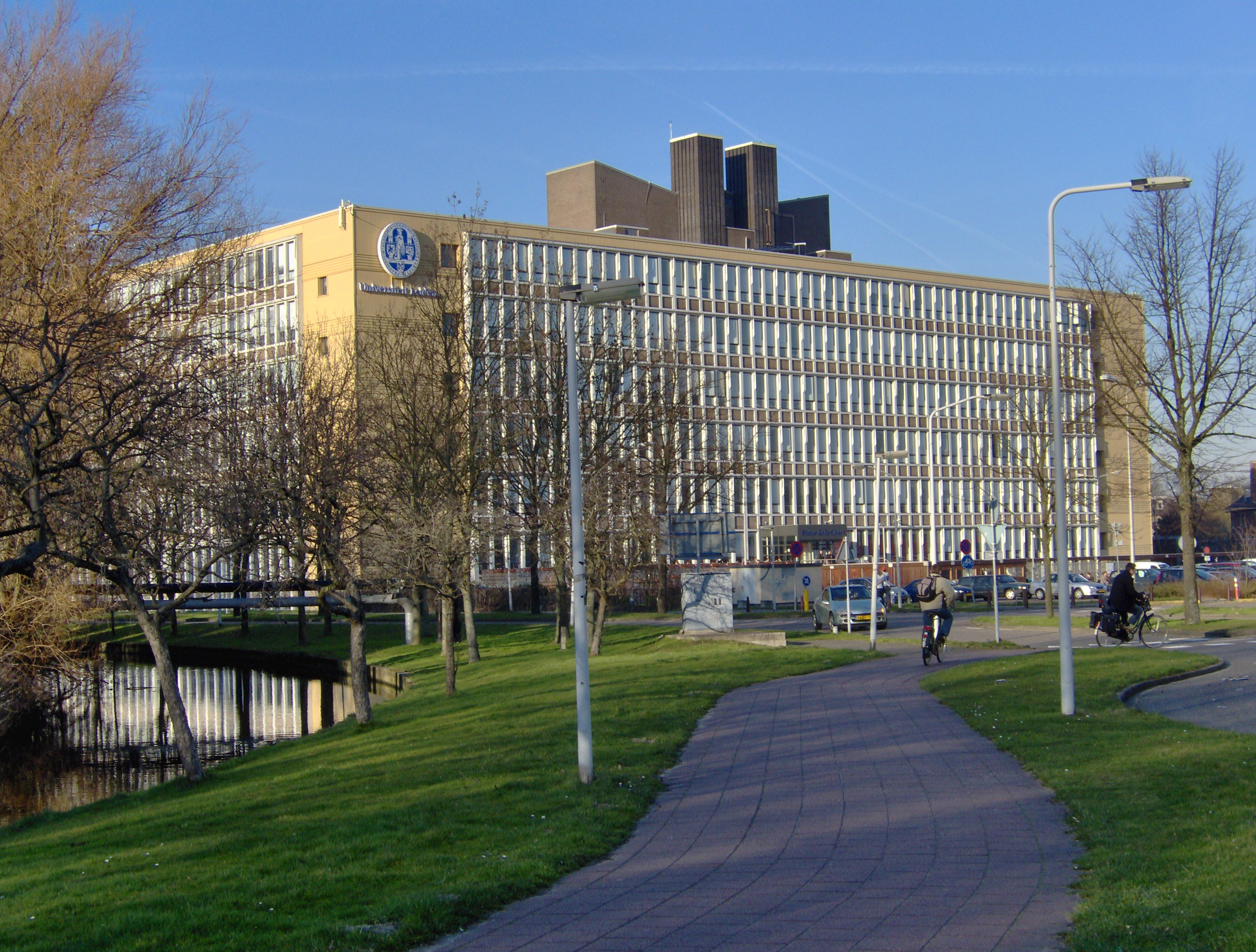
The Pieter de la Court-building, the main building of the Faculty of Social and Behavioural Sciences

=== Doctorate programmes ===
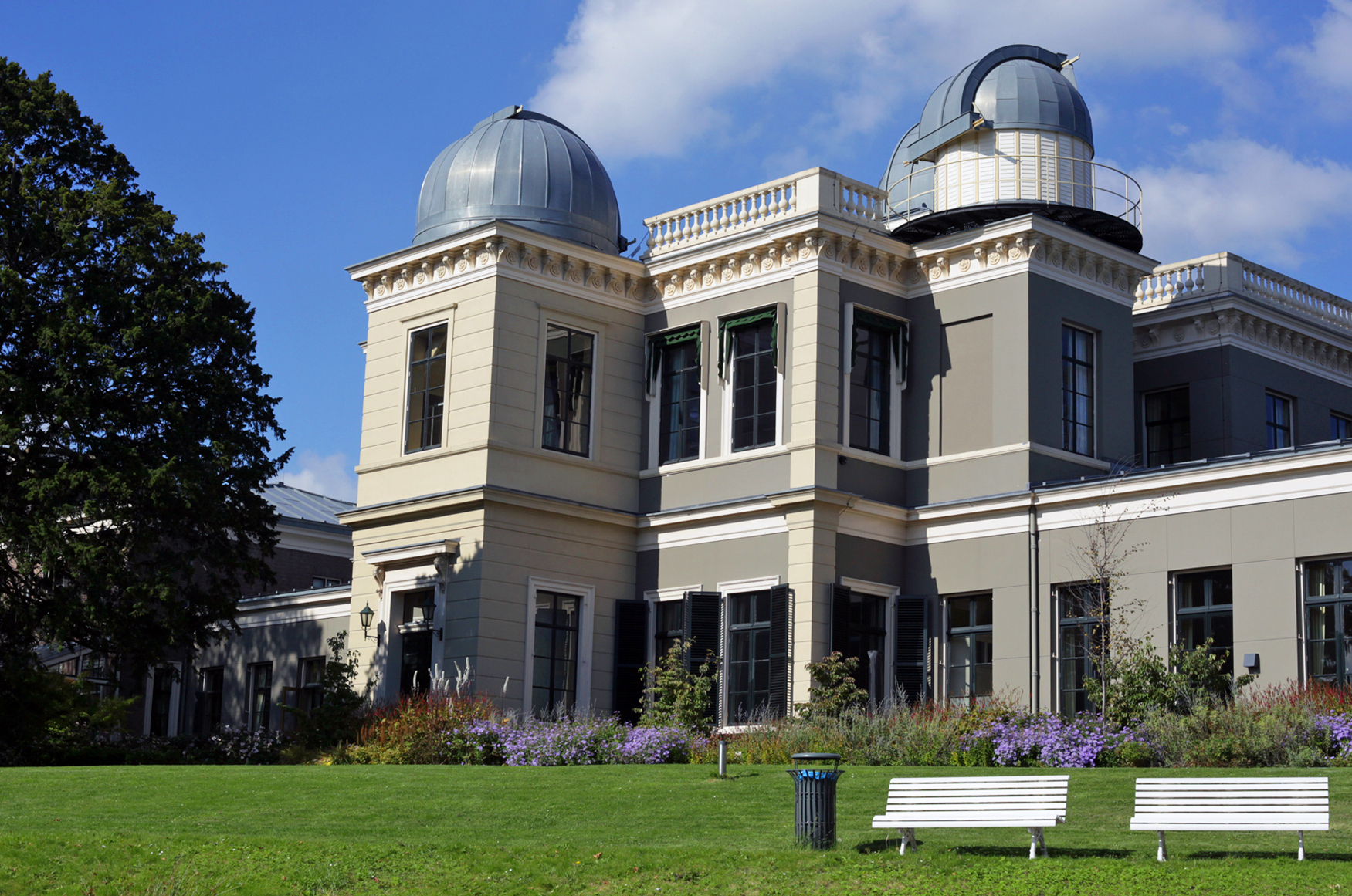
Leiden Observatory of the university.

In addition, most departments, affiliated (research) institutes, or faculties offer doctorate programmes or positions, leading to the Ph.D. degree. Most of the Ph.D. programmes offered by the university are concentrated in several research schools or institutes.

=== Research schools and affiliated institutes ===
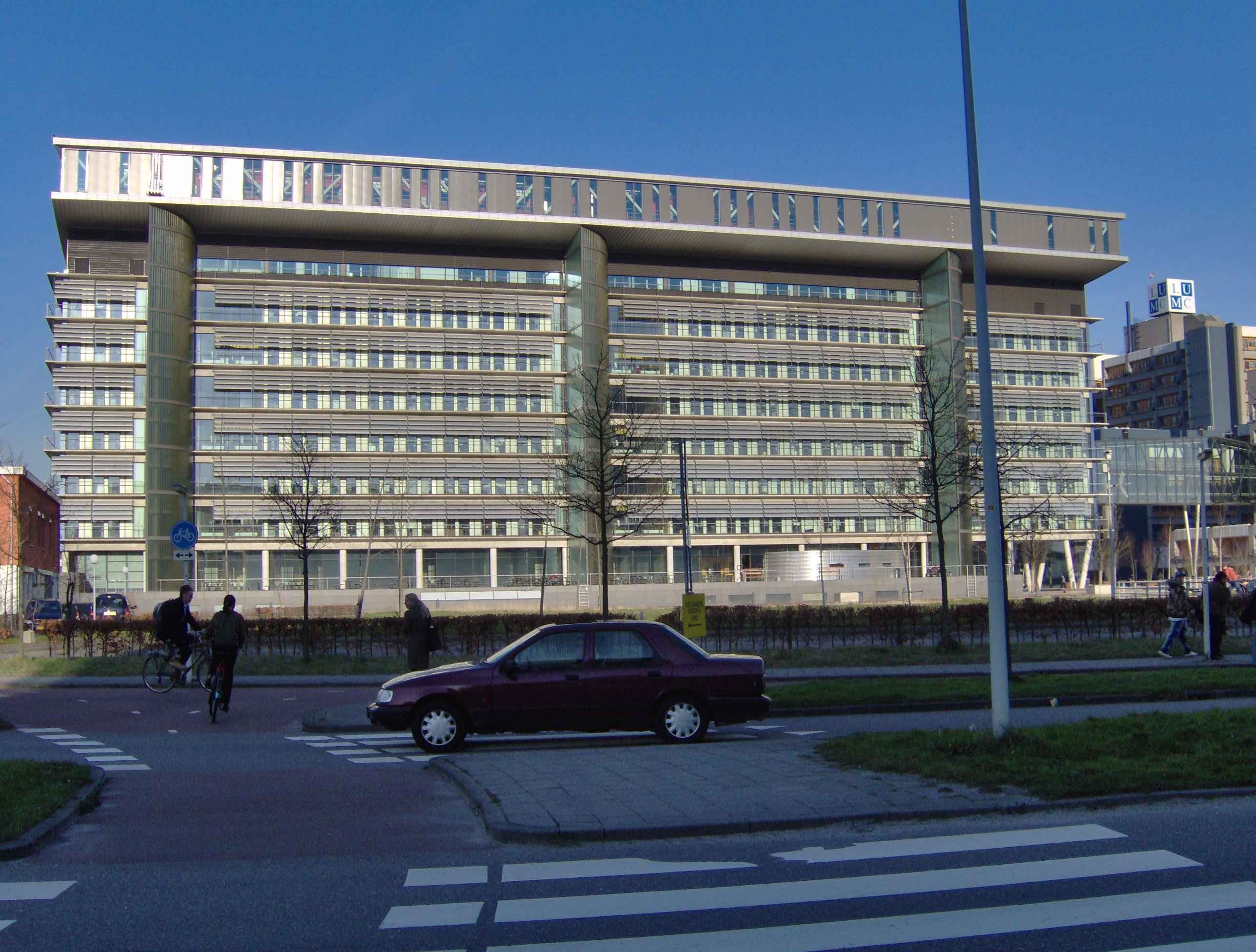
Research building of the Leiden University Medical Centre

Leiden University has more than 50 research and graduate schools and institutes. Some of them are fully affiliated with one faculty of the university, while others are interfaculty institutes or interuniversity institutes.

Institute	
ACPA	Academy of Creative and Performing Arts
ASC	African Studies Centre Leiden
CML	Institute of Environmental Sciences (CML)
CRC	Crisis Research Centre
CTI	Centre for Language and Identity
CWTS	Centre for Science and Technology Studies
The Meijers Research Institute	Research School for Legal Studies
eLaw@Leiden	Centre for Law in the Information Society
Grotius Centre	Research Centre for International Legal Studies
GSS	Leiden Graduate School of Science
Historical Institute	Leiden University Institute for History
Huizinga Instituut	Research Institute and Graduate School for Cultural History
IBL	Institute of Biology Leiden
IIAS	International Institute for Asian Studies
IIASL	International Institute of Air and Space Law
IOPS	Interuniversity Graduate School of Psychometrics and Sociometrics
ITC	International Tax Centre (ITC)
LACDR	The Leiden Academic Centre for Drug Research
LCMBS	Leiden Centre for Molecular BioScience
LEAD	Leiden Ethnosystems and Development Programme, Faculty of Science
Leyden Academy	Leyden Academy on Vitality and Ageing
LGSAS	Leiden Graduate School for Archaeology
LIACS	Leiden Institute of Advanced Computer Science
LIAS	Leiden Institute for Area Studies
LIBC	Leiden Institute for Brain and Cognition
LIC	Leiden Institute of Chemistry
LION	Leiden Institute of Physics
LISOR	Leiden Institute for the Study of Religion
LUCAS	Leiden University Centre for the Arts in Society
LUCL	Leiden University Centre for Linguistics
LUMC	Leiden University Medical Centre
Mediëvistiek	Netherlands Research School for Medieval Studies
MI	Mathematical Institute
NIG	Netherlands Institute of Government
NINO	Netherlands Institute for the Near East
NOVA	Netherlands Research School for Astronomy
N.W. Posthumus Instituut	Netherlands Research Institute and School for Economic and Social History
OIKOS	National Research School in Classical Studies
Onderzoekschool Kunstgeschiedenis	Dutch Postgraduate School for Art History
OSL	Netherlands Research School for Literary Studies
PALLAS	Pallas Institute for Cultural Disciplines
Sterrewacht Leiden	Leiden Astronomical Observatory
The Europa Institute	Leiden Law School
Van Vollenhoven Institute	Research Institute for Law, Governance and Society

== Rankings and reputations ==
University rankings

Global – Overall
- ARWU World: 101-150 (2025)
- CWUR World: 88 (2025)
- CWTS World: 72 (2024)
- QS World: =119 (2026)
- Reuters World: 71 (2019)
- THE World: =73 (2025)
- USNWR Global: 56 (2025-26)

Global – Law
- QS Law: 25 (2025)
- THE Law: 21 (2025)

Global – Liberal arts
- ARWU Social science: 27 (2024)
- QS Arts & Humanities: =46 (2025)
- QS Politics: 17 (2025)
- THE Arts and Humanities: 21 (2025)

=== Notable alumni and professors ===
Of the 112 Spinoza Prize laureates (the highest scientific award of The Netherlands), twenty-nine were granted to professors of Leiden University. Literary historian Frits van Oostrom was the first professor of Leiden to be granted the Spinoza award for his work on developing the NLCM centre (Dutch literature and culture in the Middle Ages) into a top research centre. Other Spinoza Prize winners are:

- Carlo Beenakker, physicist
- Dirk Bouwmeester, physicist
- Eveline Crone, cognitive psychologist
- Ewine van Dishoeck, astronomer
- Carsten de Dreu, organisation psychologist
- Naomi Ellemers, social psychologist
- Bernet Elzinga, psychopathologist
- Michel Ferrari, neurologist
- Marijn Franx, astronomer
- Els Goulmy, transplantation biologist
- Corinne Hofman, archaeologist
- Marinus van IJzendoorn, pedagogue
- Marc Koper, electrochemist
- Frederik Kortlandt, linguist
- Hendrik Lenstra, mathematician
- Pieter Muysken, linguist
- Sjaak Neefjes, chemical immunologist
- Frits van Oostrom, literary historian
- Michel Orrit, physicist
- Hermen Overkleeft, biologist
- Judith Pollmann, historian
- Wil Roebroeks, archaeologist
- Frits Rosendaal, epidemiologist
- Ineke Sluiter, classicist
- Ignaas Snellen, astrophysicist
- Alexander Tielens, astronomer
- Aad van der Vaart, statistician
- Maria Yazdanbakhsh, parasitologist
- Jan Zaanen, physicist

The Stevin Prize laureates who have achieved exceptional success in knowledge exchange and impact for society include the following Leiden professors: health psychologist Andrea Evers, immunology technologist Ton Schumacher and psychologist Judi Mesman.

Other notable Leiden researchers were the Arabist and Islam expert Christiaan Snouck Hurgronje, the law expert Cornelis van Vollenhoven and historian Johan Huizinga, all during the 1920s and 1930s. Martinus Beijerinck, one of the founders of virology, finished his Ph.D. at Leiden in 1877.

=== Nobel laureates ===
Kamerlingh Onnes was awarded the Nobel Prize for Physics in 1913. Three other professors received the Nobel Prize for their research performed at Universiteit Leiden: Hendrik Antoon Lorentz and Pieter Zeeman received the Nobel Prize for their pioneering work in the field of optical and electronic phenomena, and the physiologist Willem Einthoven for his invention of the string galvanometer, which among other things, enabled the development of electrocardiography.

Nobel laureates associated with Leiden include the physicists Albert Einstein, Enrico Fermi, and Paul Ehrenfest. Other Leiden-affiliated Nobel laureates include Jacobus Henricus van 't Hoff, Johannes Diderik van der Waals, Tobias Asser, Albert Szent-Györgyi, Igor Tamm, Jan Tinbergen, Nikolaas Tinbergen, Tjalling Koopmans, Nicolaas Bloembergen, and Niels Jerne.

== See also ==
- Leiden school
- Leiden University College The Hague
- List of early modern universities in Europe
- List of rectores magnifici of Leiden University
- LSV Minerva
