= European Network for the Investigation of Gender Incongruence =

Multicenter prospective cohort study

The European Network for the Investigation of Gender Incongruence (ENIGI) is a collaborative multicenter prospective cohort study on gender incongruence which started in 2010 and is being conducted by several transgender clinics in Europe. The clinics that have been involved in the initiative include the Center of Expertise on Gender Dysphoria (CEGD) at Amsterdam University Medical Centers, location VUmc in Amsterdam, Netherlands, the Center for Sexology and Gender at Ghent University Hospital in Ghent, Belgium, the University Medical Center Hamburg-Eppendorf in Hamburg, Germany, the Oslo University Hospital, Rikshospitalet in Oslo, Norway, and the University Hospital of the University of Florence in Florence, Italy. The clinics in the ENIGI initiative developed a common study and treatment protocol and maintain a shared database. The study includes an endocrine part to evaluate the effects of transgender hormone therapy in transfeminine and transmasculine people.

== See also ==
- Study of Transition, Outcomes, and Gender (STRONG)
