= Amsterdam University Medical Center =

Amsterdam UMC

Geography
- Location: Meibergdreef 9, 1105AZ (AMC) & De Boelelaan 1117, 1081 HV (VUmc), Amsterdam, The Netherlands
- Coordinates: 52°17′40″N 4°57′27″E & 52°20′04″N 4°51′36″E

Organisation
- Type: Teaching
- Affiliated university: University of Amsterdam & Vrije Universiteit Amsterdam

Services
- Emergency department: Level 1 Trauma Center (location AMC), Accident & Emergency (location VUmc)
- Beds: 1700

Helipads
- Helipad: Yes (both locations)

History
- Former names: Academic Medical Center & VU University Medical Center
- Opened: 1983 (location AMC) & 2001 (location VUmc)

Links
- Website: amsterdamumc.org
- Lists: Hospitals in The Netherlands

Amsterdam University Medical Center, often shortened to Amsterdam UMC, is a collective of two teaching hospitals in Amsterdam. Formed, in 2018, after the administrative merger of the city's two university medical centers: the Academic Medical Center and the VU University Medical Center.

The Academic Medical Center functioned as the University of Amsterdam's teaching hospital, while the VU University Medical Center acted as the teaching hospital for the Vrije Universiteit Amsterdam. Both medical centers are now known as Amsterdam UMC, location AMC and Amsterdam UMC, location VUmc respectively.

In 2025, Newsweek ranked Amsterdam UMC as the world's 31st best hospital and the best in the Netherlands.

== Administrative Structure ==
The two university medical centers, administratively, merged on 7 June 2018. This means that both medical centers remain as independent legal bodies, however both executive boards are composed of the same five individuals. Including the Dean of the University of Amsterdam's Faculty of Medicine and the Dean of the Vrije Universiteit Amsterdam's Faculty of Medicine. On 1 January 2024, the two hospitals completed a legal merger.

A logical conclusion of the merger is the spread of forms of health care, research and education across both locations. At Amsterdam UMC, location AMC health care will be concentrated around three themes: Women & Child, Emergency Medicine and Cardiovascular Care. While at Amsterdam UMC, location VUmc, the departments of Oncology, Neurology and Public Health will be concentrated.

== Medical Research ==
Medical research in Amsterdam stretches back to the time of Dr. Nicolaes Tulp, the University of Amsterdam's first anatomist, whose work was captured in the Rembrandt painting, The Anatomy Lesson of Dr. Nicolaes Tulp. In 2023, Research at Amsterdam UMC is led by more than 440 professors and consists of eight research institutes:

- Amsterdam Neuroscience
- Amsterdam Public Health
- Amsterdam Movement Sciences
- Amsterdam Institute of Infection and Immunity
- Cancer Center Amsterdam
- Amsterdam Reproduction & Development
- Amsterdam Gastroenterology Endocrinology Metabolism
- Amsterdam Cardiovascular Sciences

Across these eight research institutes, researchers with a medical background work with researchers from other fields across both the University of Amsterdam and the Vrije Universitiet Amsterdam. This level of collaboration is also supported by the Amsterdam Institute of Global Health and Development.

In the three years from 2015 to 2018, Amsterdam UMC contributed to more than 22,000 scientific publications. The most of any university medical center in the Netherlands and the second highest in Europe, behind University College London. Amsterdam UMC research has also laid the groundwork for multiple patented therapies, including Nirsevimab, originally discovered by cell biologist Hergen Spits.

== Education ==
Amsterdam UMC's two medical faculties are consistently ranked in the world's top 100 medical schools by both the Times Higher Education World University Rankings and by QS Rankings. In 2023, the University of Amsterdam's Medical Faculty was ranked 1st in the Netherlands, 10th in Europe and 30th in the world by QS. The Medical Faculty of the Vrije Universiteit Amsterdam was ranked 7th in the Netherlands, 42nd in Europe and 87th in the world by QS.

Currently both faculties are home to more than 2500 students each. In total there are also more than 3000 PhD students across Amsterdam UMC's eight research institutes.

== History of Location AMC ==
Previously in the centre of Amsterdam were there two large hospitals, both built in the 1800s: the Binnengasthuis and the Wihelmina Gasthuis. Due to aging state of the Binnengasthuis it was decided, together with the University of Amsterdam, to build a new campus, where patient care, research and education would take place in one building.

Designed by Dick van Mourik and Marius Duintjer, Location AMC opened in 1984 and consists of multiple independent buildings that are connected by various open, roofed streets with squares in between. The buildings architecture is characterised by the use of raw concrete, both inside and outside.

Location AMC is also home to the Museum Vrolik, a collection of more than 10,000 anatomical preparations. As well as more than 7,000 pieces of art, placed inside and outside.

== History of Location VUmc ==
VU University Medical Center opened in 1964 as the teaching hospital of the Vrije Universiteit Amsterdam, the city's second university. In 2001, it became a fully fledged university medical centre by merging with the medical faculty of the Vrije Universitiet Amsterdam.

VUmc, and subsequently Amsterdam UMC, is known for it Center of Expertise on Gender Dysphoria (CEGD). Opened in 1972, the centre is one of the largest and oldest in the world and has treated more than 10,000 transgender patients in the previous 50 years. The centre is the home of what has now become known as the "Dutch Protocol".

== De Anatomische Les ==
In honour of Dr. Nicolaes Tulp, Amsterdam UMC hosts its own yearly Anatomy Lesson (de Anatomische Les, in Dutch) in the Concertgebouw, where a medical anatomy lesson is combined with a live cultural programme.

Previous speakers include David Weatherall, Anthony Fauci, David Page and John Ioannidis. In 2024, the lesson was given by Sadaf Farooqi.

== Notable faculty & alumni ==
- Christiaan Eijkman, winner of the Nobel Prize for Physiology or Medicine in 1929 for the discovery of vitamins.
- Sir Alex Jeffreys, inventor of DNA fingerprinting.
- M.A. Mendes de Leon, one of the founders of gynaecology in the Netherlands.
- Tina Strobos, psychiatrist and member of the Dutch resistance during World War II.
- André Kuipers, Dutch astronaut.
- Arjen Dondorp, intensivist and chair of the WHO Technical Expert Group on antimalarial medication.
- Marcel Levi, intensivist, former head of location AMC, University College London Hospitals and current chairman of the Dutch Research Council.
- Jope Lange, former president of the International AIDS Society who was killed when MH17 was shot down.
- Ronald Plasterk, geneticist and former Dutch Interior Minister.
- Vincent Gouttebarge, former French footballer, current medical researcher and Chief Medical Officer of FIFPRO.
- Peter van der Voort, intensivist, former Dutch politician and Head of Intensive Care at University Medical Center Groningen.
- Piet Borst, biologist, cancer researcher and winner of the 2023 Lasker Award.
- Louis Gooren, endocrinologist credited with opening the first Transgender clinic in the world.
- Hanneke Schuitemaker, virologist and Global Head of Viral Vaccine Discovery and Translational Medicine at Johnson & Johnson.
- Els Borst, immunologist and former Dutch Health minister.
- Marjo van der Knaap, pediatric neurologist and winner of the 2008 Spinoza Prize.
- Ernst Kuipers, gastroenterologist and former Dutch Health minister.
- Jaap Goudsmit, Dutch scientist and author, known for his research in the field of AIDS and influenza.
