= Transgender health care =

Health care of transgender individuals

Transgender health care includes the prevention, diagnosis and treatment of physical and mental health conditions which affect transgender individuals. A major component of transgender health care is gender-affirming care, the medical aspect of gender transition. Questions implicated in transgender health care include gender variance, sex reassignment therapy, health risks (in relation to violence and mental health), and access to healthcare for trans people in different countries around the world. Gender-affirming health care can include psychological, medical, physical, and social behavioral care. The purpose of gender-affirming care is to help a transgender individual conform to their desired gender identity.

In the 1920s, physician Magnus Hirschfeld conducted formal studies to understand gender dysphoria and human sexuality and advocated for communities that were marginalized. His research and work provided a new perspective on gender identity, gender expression, and sexuality. This was the first time there was a challenge against societal norms. In addition to his research, Hirschfeld also coined the term transvestite, which in modern terms is known as "transgender". Hirschfeld's work was ended during the Nazi German era when many transgender individuals were arrested and sent to concentration camps.

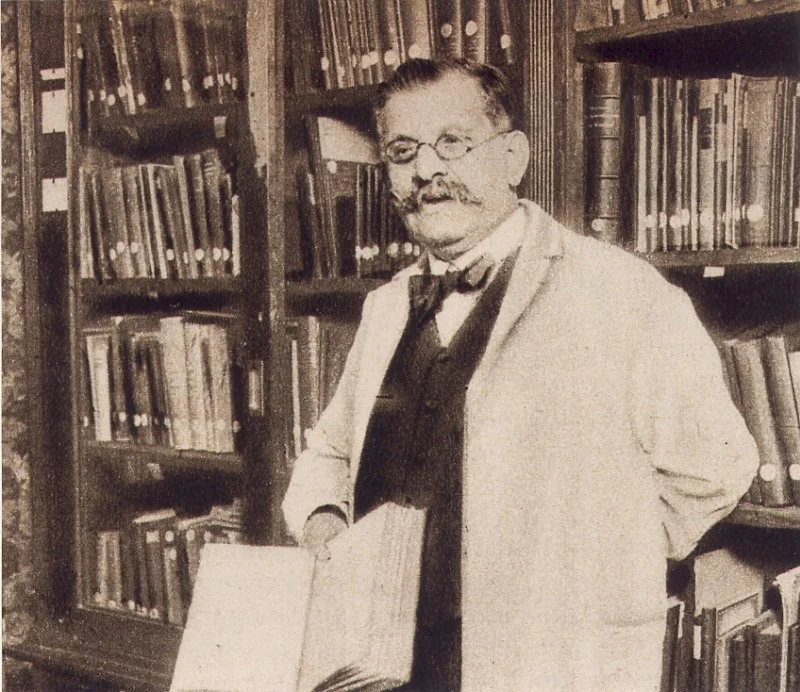
Magnus Hirschfeld, 1919

In 1966 the Johns Hopkins Gender Identity Clinic opened; it was one of the first in the US to provide care for transgender individuals, including hormone replacement therapy, surgery, psychological counseling, and other gender affirmative healthcare. The clinic required patients before a gender affirmation surgery to go through a program called "Real Life Test". The Real Life Test was a program where before a gender affirming surgery the patient was required to live with their desired gender role. In 1979 the clinic was closed by the newly appointed director of psychiatry Paul R. McHugh.

== Medical characterization of gender variance ==
Gender variance is defined in medical literature as "gender identity, expression, or behavior that falls outside of culturally defined norms associated with a specific gender". For centuries, gender variance was seen by medicine as a pathology. The World Health Organization identified gender dysphoria as a mental disorder in the International Classification of Diseases (ICD) until 2018. Gender dysphoria was also listed in the Diagnostic and Statistical Manual of Mental Disorders (DSM-5) of the American Psychiatric Association, where it was previously called "transsexualism" and "gender identity disorder".

In 2018, the ICD-11 included the term "gender incongruence" as "marked and persistent incongruence between an individual's experienced gender and the assigned sex", where gender variant behaviour and preferences do not necessarily imply a medical diagnosis. However, the difference between "gender dysphoria" and "gender incongruence" is not always clear in the medical literature.

Some studies posit that treating gender variance as a medical condition has negative effects on the health of transgender people and claim that assumptions of coexisting psychiatric symptoms should be avoided. Other studies argue that gender incongruence diagnosis may be important and even positive for transgender people at the individual and social level.

As there are various ways of classifying or characterizing those who are either diagnosed or self-affirm as transgender individuals, the literature cannot clearly estimate how prevalent these experiences are within the total population. The results of a recent systematic review highlight the need to standardize the scope and methodology related to data collection of those presenting as transgender.

== Mental health assistance ==
Due to the discrimination they face, trans individuals often present significant mental health disparities. Among them, it is estimated that 32-50% of trans individuals across various countries have attempted suicide, with this high prevalence attributed to factors such as victimization, bullying, violence, social and familial rejection, as well as discrimination in different public sectors. Other than gender dysphoria, trans individuals are also affected by mental health diagnoses, such as major depression and generalized anxiety, at far greater rates than the non-trans population. Whilst gender-affirming care has a positive impact on trans individuals' mental health and may lessen several symptoms, the psychological improvements of such care are often limited by the minority stressors affecting the trans population.

Due to these factors, mental health assistance through means such as psychotherapy may play an important role in addressing trans patients' mental health. Mental health assessments and treatment may be conducted prior to the initiation of gender-affirming care as a means of ensuring the patient's informed consent and complementing medical transition. Pyschotherapy as a requirement for the inititation of affirmative medical care today is discouraged by trans health care protocols, as are approaches attempting to change the patient's identity or skew self-exploration towards one particular direction.

=== Identity exploration ===
Because the development and consolidation of gender identity is a diverse process among trans adolescents, it is recommended that healthcare professionals offer a respectful environment for clients—especially youth—to explore and express different facets of their identity, including the need for gender-affirming care. It is important that gender exploration is not used to delay gender-affirming care or attempt tracing trans identity to pathologies, as such approaches would be tantamount to conversion practices, which are known for causing significant harm.

== Gender-affirming care ==
Various options are available for transgender people to pursue physical transition. There have been options for transitioning for transgender individuals since 1917. Gender-affirming care helps people to change their physical appearance and/or sex characteristics to accord with their gender identity; it includes gender-affirming hormone therapy and gender-affirming surgery. While many transgender people do elect to transition physically, every transgender person has different needs and, as such, there is no required transition plan. Preventive health care is a crucial part of transitioning and a primary care physician is recommended for transgender people who are transitioning.

=== Eligibility ===
In the 11th version of the International Classification of Diseases (ICD-11), the diagnosis is known as gender incongruence. ICD-11 states that "Gender variant behaviour and preferences alone are not a basis for assigning the diagnosis."

The US Diagnostic and Statistical Manual of Mental Disorders (DSM) names it gender dysphoria (in version 5). Some people who are validly diagnosed have no desire for all or some parts of hormone replacement therapy, or gender affirming surgery, and/or are not appropriate candidates for such treatment.

The general standards for diagnosing, as well as treating distress caused by gender incongruence or gender dysphoria are outlined in the WPATH Standards of Care for the Health of Transgender and Gender Diverse People. As of February 2023, the most recent version of the standards is Version 8, called SOC8 in short. According to the standards of care, "Gender Dysphoria describes a state of distress or discomfort that may be experienced because a person's gender identity differs from that which is physically and/or socially attributed to their sex assigned at birth... Not all transgender and gender diverse people experience gender dysphoria." Gender nonconformity is not the same as gender dysphoria; nonconformity, according to the standards of care, is not a pathology and does not require medical treatment.

The WPATH Standards of Care in the latest version 8 from February 2023, follow an informed consent model, which is the default approach that most medical professionals administering gender-affirming care follow today. Informed consent approaches include conversations between the medical provider and person seeking care on the details of risks and outcomes, current understandings of scientific research, and how the provider can best assist the person in making decisions.

Local standards of care exist in many countries, with most local standards being based on the WPATH standards, with some minor exceptions.

=== Eligibility for different stages of treatment ===
While a mental health assessment is recommended as standard practice by the WPATH Standards of Care (SoC), psychotherapy is not an absolute requirement but is highly recommended.

Hormone replacement therapy is to be initiated from a qualified health professional. The general requirements, according to the WPATH standards, include:

1. Persistent, well-documented gender dysphoria;
2. Capacity to make a fully informed decision and to consent for treatment;
3. Age of majority in a given country (however, the WPATH standards of care provide separate discussion of children and adolescents);
4. If significant medical or mental health concerns are present, they must be reasonably well-controlled.

Often, at least a certain period of psychological counseling is required before initiating hormone replacement therapy, as is a period of living in the desired gender role, if possible, to ensure that they can psychologically function in that life-role. On the other hand, some clinics provide hormone therapy based on informed consent alone.

=== Eligibility of minors ===
While the WPATH standards of care generally require the patient to have reached the age of medical majority, they include a separate section devoted to children and adolescents. Prepubescent children do not have access to medical intervention for gender-affirming therapy. After puberty, some medical intervention is available for adolescents depending on specific criteria for gender incongruence diagnosis, capacity for informed consent, and mental and physical health. According to a study by JAMA Pediatrics published in January 2025, less than 0.1% of adolescents covered by private medical insurance in the US take gender-affirming medication to treat gender dysphoria.

=== Hormone replacement therapy (gender-affirming hormone therapy) ===
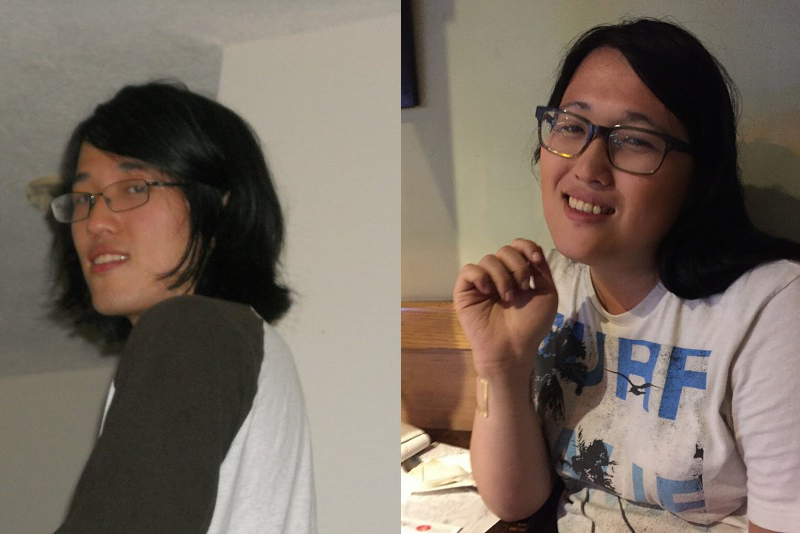
A transgender woman before and after two years of hormone replacement therapy

Hormone replacement therapy (HRT) is primarily concerned with alleviating gender dysphoria in transgender people. Hormone therapy targets the secondary sex characteristics. Trans women typically use feminizing therapy, the goal of which is to develop female characteristics while suppressing male characteristics. Trans men typically use masculinizing therapy, which has the opposite goal – to develop male characteristics while suppressing female characteristics.

Trans women are usually treated with estrogen and complementary anti-androgenic therapy. According to UCSF Transgender Care, "The primary class of estrogen used for feminizing therapy is 17-beta estradiol, which is a 'bioidentical' hormone in that it is chemically identical to that from a human ovary." The anti-adrogenic medications include spironolactone and the 5-alpha reductase inhibitors, finasteride and dutasteride. This therapy induces breast formation, reduces male hair pattern growth, and changes fat distribution, also leading to a decreased testicular size and erectile function.

Trans men are normally treated with exogenous testosterone. Several formulations of testosterone exist, and in the U.S., all formulations are "bioidentical" to endogenous testosterone of testicular origin. Masculinizing therapy is expected to cease menses, to increase facial and body hair, to cause changes in skin and in fat distribution, and to increase muscle mass and libido. After at least three months, other effects are expected, such as the deepening of the voice and changes in sexual organs (such as atrophy of vaginal tissues, and increased clitoral size). Regular monitoring by an endocrinologist is a strong recommendation to ensure the safety of individuals as they transition.

Access to hormone replacement therapy has been shown to improve quality of life for people in the female-to-male community when compared to female-to-male people who do not have access to hormone replacement therapy. Feminizing therapy has also been found to improve well-being. Interestingly, one systematic review determined that "Overall, the qualitative literature tended to support positive changes in well-being among people after starting feminizing hormone therapy, although often with the qualification that improvements in well-being were attributed to satisfaction with changes in appearance rather than to direct effects of hormones on psychosocial states."

Hormone therapy for transgender individuals has been shown in medical literature to be safe, when supervised by a qualified medical professional. Monitoring of risk factors associated with hormone replacement therapy, such as prolactin levels in transgender women and polycythemia levels in transgender men, are crucial for the preventive health care of transgender people taking these treatments.

Many transgender people lack access to a supportive, high quality, non-discriminatory health care system. Therefore, the only option for GAHT may be self-administered medications (testosterone, oestrogen, anti-androgens,..etc.), without professional guidance. An examination of the use of self-medication found that people who self-medicated were more likely to experience adverse health effects from preexisting conditions such as high blood pressure as well as slower development of desired secondary sex characteristics.

Transgender people seeking surgery may be informed they will need to take hormones for the rest of their life if they want to maintain the feminizing effects of oestrogen or the masculinizing effects of testosterone. Their dose of hormones will usually be reduced, but it should still be enough to produce the effects that they need and to keep them well, and to protect them against osteoporosis (thinning of the bones) as they get older. If they are still on hormone blockers, they will stop taking them altogether.

=== Reproductive healthcare ===
There are frequent misconceptions within both patients and doctors about how hormone replacement therapy affects fertility. One common misconception is that starting it automatically leads to infertility. While it may impact the ability to be fertile, it does not mean it leads to a hundred percent infertility rate. There have been numerous cases of transgender men experiencing pregnancy and abortion. As trans men and doctors can be under this misconception about hormone replacement therapy impacting fertility and serving as a form of contraception, keeping people informed on fertility options remains crucial.

For trans women, it is possible for them to undergo cryopreservation before starting hormone replacement therapy. As evidence has shown that trans women tend to have lower motile sperm compared to their cisgender counterparts, fertility preservation can be important for individuals anticipating having biological children in the future. While fertility preservation is important to consider before starting HRT, it is possible in some cases to regain fertility after halting HRT for a period of time.

It is also important to educate transgender youth on their fertility preservation options. This is because few adolescents end up doing so, alongside transgender adolescents reporting distress at the prospect of becoming infertile due to medical conditions and treatment relating to their transgender identity.

=== Gender-affirming surgery ===
The goal of gender-affirming surgery is to align the secondary sexual characteristics of transgender people with their gender identity. As hormone replacement therapy, gender-affirming surgery is also employed as a response to diagnosis gender dysphoria.

The World Professional Association for Transgender Health (WPATH) Standards of Care recommend additional requirements for gender-affirming surgery when compared to hormone replacement therapy. Whereas hormone replacement therapy can be obtained through something as simple as an informed consent form, gender-affirming surgery can require a supporting letter from a licensed therapist (two letters for genital surgery such as vaginoplasty or phalloplasty), hormonal treatment, and (for genital surgery) completion of a 12-month period in which the person lives full-time as their gender. WPATH standards, while commonly used in gender clinics, are non-binding; many trans patients undergoing surgery do not meet all of the eligibility criteria.

=== Effectiveness ===
Untreated transgender people experience high rates of depression, anxiety, addiction, and suicide compared to the general population. In systematic reviews, hormone therapy and gender-affirming surgery were associated with improved mental health outcomes. In follow-up studies, most trans people experience improved psychological, social, and sexual functioning, improved global functioning, and significantly reduced suicidal ideation. Less than 1% of post-operative trans patients regret surgery. Gender-affirming surgery alone may not eliminate dysphoria or suicidality, and some trans people may need further mental health care in addition to surgery.

Some researchers have expressed a need for further high-quality research on mental health outcomes following gender-affirming treatments. Certain statistically robust study designs, such as randomized controlled trials, are not applicable in studying some aspects of transgender health care due to ethical concerns (for example, it would be severely unethical to test the long-term efficacy of hormone therapy by treating some prospective patients with a placebo) as well as methodological hurdles (largely because affirmative treatments have evident effects on physiology, thus compromising blinding).

== Advocacy for transgender health care ==
=== Transgender Law Center ===
Transgender Law Center is a national trans-led organization founded in 2002, that is dedicated to advocate for the rights and well-being of transgender and gender nonconforming people with legal advocacy, policy initiatives, and community empowerment. Transgender Law Center expand their work to multiple important areas, including but not limited to, healthcare access, education, employment and housing.

They advocate for better healthcare access for transgender people with multiple efforts. With policy advocacy and litigation efforts, Transgender Law Center advocates for laws and regulations to require insurance companies to cover gender-affirming care and engages in legal actions to fight against and challenge practices and policies that are discriminatory towards transgender people. Transgender Law Center also engages in public awareness campaigns and community engagements to ensure the significancy of transgender healthcare along with the barriers and unmet needs that are being advocated reflects real-world experiences, hoping to shift public perceptions and gain support for necessary changes to be made. For the professionals, Transgender Law Center provides education and trainings for healthcare providers and other professionals to make efforts into increasing awareness and promoting equal and competent care for transgender people. In effort to provide more resources, they address systemic challenges and organize guides and reports on best practices for transgender healthcare. Last but not least, Transgender Law Center offers direct support and gives legal support to those who are facing healthcare discriminations, in need of resources or referrals, and more.

=== Lambda Legal ===
Lambda Legal is a United States national organization that advocates for the rights of LGBTQ people and those who are living with HIV since 1973. They make the effort to make changes to policies at all federal, state, and local levels for LGBTQ rights, while engaging with health departments to ensure that the current regulations and guidelines are aligned with the needs of LGBTQ community.

Notably, Lambda Legal's involvement has led to several successful legal attempts in expanding not only healthcare rights but also protections for transgender people. They served as legal attorneys for the LGBTQ community along with those living with HIV, with all their closed to current active cases published on their website.

=== GLMA: Health Professionals Advancing LGBTQ Equality ===
GLMA: Health Professionals Advancing LGBTQ Equality is the world's largest and oldest LGBTQ healthcare professionals association founded in 1981. It is also formerly known as the Gay and Lesbian Medical Association.

GLMA provides resources along with educational programs to help healthcare professionals gain the knowledge and skills in giving appropriate care to LGBTQ patients whilst hosting conferences and workshops to foster the environment for discussion of the latest research or emerging issues in the field. They also conduct LGBTQ centered research to identify the disparities and health needs to publish guidelines and inform about evidence-based healthcare practices and policies to LGBTQ health.

=== Center of Excellence for Transgender Health (UCSF) ===
The Center of Excellence for Transgender Health at the University of California, San Francisco was established in 2009, dedicated to improving health equity for trans and gender nonconforming communities. The Center of Excellence for Transgender Health is a national advisory board composed of transgender leaders from across the United States, bringing expertise in the research of transgender health. Guidelines for Primary and Gender-Affirming Care of Transgender and Gender Nonbinary People contains guidelines developed by The Center of Excellence for Transgender Health that are widely used clinical guidelines for transgender healthcare.

== Issues affecting transgender patients ==
=== Transgender health care misinformation ===
A vocal lobby of anti-trans actors as part of the anti-gender movement attempt to spread misinformation regarding transgender health care, attempting to influence governments and the public and to deny legal recognition of transgender and gender diverse people and access to gender-affirming health care.

The United Nations Independent Expert on sexual orientation and gender identity published the IESOGI Reports on Gender: The Law of Inclusion & Practices of Exclusion in 2021 that was presented at the 47th UN Human Rights Council and 76th UN General Assembly which highlighted laws violating the Universal Declaration of Human Rights and called out a series of alleged threats perpetuated by anti-trans actors in the spread of misinformation around transgender people's rights and related health care. This misinformation has resulted in some countries passing laws violating people's basic human rights such as denying legal gender recognition and restrictions on access to gender-affirming treatments, particularly for transgender youth who are being restricted from access to hormone treatments such as puberty blockers.

Anti-trans actors employ various strategies in their spread of misinformation around transgender health care by inventing pseudoscientific concepts and attacking professionals and organizations that provide gender affirming care, trying to frame gender-affirming care as "dangerous" or "experimental" or claims that a majority of transgender youth will detransition, something scientists have refuted and named the desistance myth, or can be cured using conversion therapy.

=== Detransition ===
Some transgender people may be forced to medically detransition and stop gender-affirming medical treatment due to discriminatory laws being passed in their country or state that ban access to gender-affirming health care. In rare cases, individuals may decide to cease or reverse gender-affirming medical therapy voluntarily. Reasons can include physical adverse effects, changing view of gender identity, and social rejection/discrimination. Research is very limited into the process of detransitioning. According to the International Journal of Transgender Health, the recommendation is to consult a team of providers in diverse specialties on how to proceed with the detransition process.

=== HIV in transgender people ===
Transgender people are infected by HIV at disproportionately high rates worldwide. According to the U.S. Centers for Disease Control and Prevention (CDC), in the United States in 2019, 2% of patients newly diagnosed with HIV were transgender, a higher percentage than the 0.3% of the U.S. population which self-identified as transgender. HIV prevalence is higher in transgender women compared to transgender men. One systematic review and meta-analysis found that overall HIV prevalence around the world was 19.9% in transfeminine individuals and 2.56% in transmasculine individuals. Transgender sex work are at further enhanced HIV risk, and transgender populations in African and Latin American regions have higher HIV prevalence.

Following CDC and USPSTF guidelines, UCSF recommends HIV screening for all transgender people at least once. Screening may be repeated on a case-by-case basis, depending on the person's risk for contracting HIV. The risk should be assessed based on the individual's sexual behavior. HIV risk assessment screening should account for the individual's specific anatomy and what type of sexual acts and behaviors the individual partakes in. For instance, HIV prevalence in transgender women is notably high, and a risk factor is that transgender women are frequently noted to partake in receptive anal sex with biologically male partners. There has been a tendency for these individuals to be grouped with "MSM" in research on HIV risk factors, due to a supposed shared mechanism of biological vulnerability to HIV transmission. This is problematic for a few reasons. This conflation fails to differentiate between external anatomy and gender. Additionally, this conflation may cause confuse the accurate reporting of data on the transgender population.

For transgender patients being treated for HIV with antiretroviral therapy (ART), there is risk of drug-drug interactions between the ART and hormonal therapies the patient may also be using, especially feminizing hormone therapy. There is limited data on interactions between ART and targeted feminizing therapy. However, studies have found interactions between ART and oral contraceptives, which trans-feminine individuals may take if they cannot access targeted feminizing therapy. According to a review by Wansom et al., "Significant drug–drug interactions exist between ethinyl oestradiol and two main classes of antiretroviral medications: non-nucleoside reverse transcriptase inhibitors (NNRTIs) and ritonavir-boosted protease inhibitors (PIs)." Ethinyl estradiol is commonly used in oral contraceptive medications, and it is not recommended for feminizing therapy due to enhanced risk of thromboembolism -related events.

=== Violence ===
The heightened levels of violence and abuse that transgender people experience result in unique adverse effects on bodily and mental health. Specifically, in resource-constrained settings where non-discriminatory policies may be limited or not enforced, transgender people may encounter high rates of stigma and violence which are associated with poor health outcomes. Studies in countries of the Global North show higher levels of discrimination and harassment in school, workplace, healthcare services and the family when compared with cisgender populations, situating transphobia as a key health risk factor for the physical and mental health of transgender people.

Victimization is often the outcome to disclosure for transgender individuals. Transgender individuals are pressured to conform to gender norms which make them vulnerable for victimization by peers and parents. A study done by Grossman and D'Augelli reported that transgender youth feared that may face physical and sexual violence because of their experience with harassment and discrimination. The youth also express how individuals only see them for their gender and sexuality rather than their personal traits. Many of the youth have also dropped out or experience academic decline because of the constant harassment. Victimization started on average for transgender at the age of 13, while physical abuse started at an average age 14.

Peitzmeier and colleagues conducted a study on partner violence; they found that transgender individuals are 3 times more likely than their counterparts to experience partner violence physical and sexual. Partner violence is a risk factor for numerous health outcomes like a decrease psychological well-being, a poor sexual health, etc.

There is limited data regarding the impact of social determinants of health on transgender and gender non-conforming individuals' health outcomes. However, despite the limited data available, transgender and gender non-conforming individuals have been found to be at higher risk of experiencing poor health outcomes and restricted access to health care due to increased risk for violence, isolation, and other types of discrimination both inside and outside the health care setting.

Despite its importance, access to preventive care is also limited by several factors, including discrimination and erasure. A study on young transgender women's access to HIV treatment found that one of the main contributors to not accessing care was the use of incorrect name and pronouns. A meta analysis of the National Transgender Discrimination Survey examined respondents who used the "gender not listed here" option on the survey and their experiences with accessing health care. Over a third of the people who chose that option said that they had avoided accessing general care due to bias and fears of social repercussions.

=== Mental health ===
Transgender individuals may experience distress and sadness as a result of their gender identity being inconsistent with their biological sex. This distress is referred to as gender dysphoria. Gender dysphoria is typically most upsetting for the individual prior to transitioning, and once the individual begins to transition into their desired gender, whether the transition be socially, medically, or both, the distress frequently lessens.

Transgender individuals may be bullied as a result of the gender norm. Studies revolving around the effects of bullying have shown that bullying is associated with a declining mental health. Past experience predicted more depressive symptoms and a low self-worth. A study also revealed that those who came out to school peers or staff had a greater psychological well-being despite being bullied. The effects of bullying include higher risk for substance abuse, risky behaviors like drunk driving, and higher engagement in sexual risk behaviors. Being bullied also increases absenteeism and poor grades among LGTBQ individuals. Physical symptoms can also manifest as a result including abdominal pain, poor appetite, sleeping problems, increase in blood pressure, etc. These experiences as an adolescent can have negative consequence in adulthood as well. These consequence include depression, suicide attempts, lower life satisfaction, etc.

Those who are transgender are significantly more likely to be diagnosed with anxiety disorders or depression than the general population. A number of studies suggest that the inflated rates of depression and anxiety in transgender individuals may partially be because of systematic discrimination or a lack of support. Evidence suggests that these increased rates begin to normalize when transgender individuals are accepted as their identified gender and when they live within a supportive household.

Many studies report extremely high rates of suicide within the transgender community. A United States study of 6,450 transgender individuals found that 41% of them had attempted suicide, as differing from the national average of 4.6%. The very same survey found that these rates were the most high for certain demographics, with transgender youth between the ages of 18 and 24 having the highest percent. Individuals in the survey who were multiracial, had lower levels of education, and those with a lower annual income were all more likely to have attempted. Specifically, transgender males as a group are the most likely to attempt suicide, more so than transgender females. Later surveys suggest that the rate of suicidal attempts for non-binary individuals is in between the two. Transgender adults who have "de-transitioned", meaning having gone back to living as their sex assigned at birth, are significantly more likely to attempt suicide than transgender adults who have never "de-transitioned".

Several studies have shown the relation between minority stress and the heightened rate of depression and other mental illness among both transgender men and women. The expectation to experience rejection can become an important stressor for transgender and gender non-conforming individuals. Mental health problems among trans people are related to higher rates of self-harm, drug usage, and suicidal ideations and attempts.

=== Health experiences ===
Trans people report multiple negative experiences in health care encounters, contributing to stigmatization of their gender identity. A systematic review conducted by researchers at James Cook University reported that 75.3% of respondents have negative experiences during physician visits when seeking gender identity-based care. Transgender patients also face obstacles to accessing health care that result in adverse effects on their health and quality of life. These include unsafe public spaces, lack of knowledgeable health care professionals, discrimination while accessing care, lack of institutional support, long distances to access treatment, and denial of health care services and health insurance benefits. These often result in trans people avoiding or delaying health care.

Trans patients may also avoid treatment as a result of their gender identities being treated as psychological illnesses, or because they fear "discrimination and suboptimal or inappropriate care" as a result of disclosing their gender identities. For instance, after a transgender man seeking medical care in the emergency department was verbally assaulted by the hospital employees, who repeatedly referred to him as a woman, he left the hospital premises before receiving the care he needed. According to a systematic review conducted by Hermaszewska and colleagues, "some transgender people are forced to migrate to countries that offer them better legal protection and wider social acceptance". Others may self-prescribe medication such as gender-affirming hormone therapy. More training in trans-inclusive health care principles may lead to more specialists, better standards of care in general and fewer health inequalities for trans people.

=== Clinical environment ===
Guidelines from the UCSF Transgender Care Center state the importance of visibility in chosen gender identity for transgender or non-binary patients. Safe environments include a two-step process in collecting gender identity data by differentiating between personal identity and assignments at birth for medical histories. Common techniques recommended are asking patients their preferred name, pronouns, and other names they may go by in legal documents. In addition, visibility of non-cisgender identities is defined by the work environment of the clinic. Front-desk staff and medical assistants will interact with patients, for which these guidelines recommend appropriate training. The existence of at least one gender-neutral bathroom also shows consideration of patients with non-binary gender identities.

Clinicians may improperly connect transgender people's symptoms to their gender transition, a form of diagnostic overshadowing known as trans broken arm syndrome. Trans broken arm syndrome is particularly prevalent among mental health practitioners, but exists in all fields of medicine. Misguided investigation of transition-related causes can frustrate patients and cause delay in or refusal of treatment, or misdiagnosis and prescription of a wrong treatment. Misattribution of symptoms to gender-affirming hormone therapy may also cause doctors to erroneously recommend the patient stop taking hormones. Trans broken arm syndrome may also manifest as health insurance companies refusing to pay for treatments, claiming that a mental or physical health problem is inevitable or untreatable due to the patient's transgender status or that a treatment would be too experimental because the patient is transgender. According to The SAGE Encyclopedia of Trans Studies, trans broken arm syndrome is a form of discrimination against transgender people. A 2021 survey by TransActual shows that 57% of transgender people in the United Kingdom put off seeing a doctor when they were ill. In 2014, 43% of transgender counselling clients in the UK said their counsellor "wanted to explore transgender issues in therapy even when this wasn't the reason they had sought help".

==== Insurance ====
The transgender population has faced an increased burden of disease due to the lack of gender affirming coverage by insurance. Compared to the cisgender population, the transgender community has a lower insurance rate and faces obstacles with insurance (both private and public) denying coverage for many of their healthcare needs. According to the United States Transgender Survey (USTC), 20% of the transgender community reported insurance coverage for gender affirming care being partially covered or not being covered at all. Without insurance coverage, the transgender community is left with numerous out of pocket costs. The lack of insurance coverage denies these patients their healthcare needs and creates financial insecurity.

These challenges with insurance create a decrease in healthcare outreach by the transgender community due to the costs. According to the United States Transgender Survey (USTS), 37.6% of the transgender community reported missing or avoiding preventative screenings and healthcare visits due to the costs This creates an increased burden of disease, and statistics show a higher rate of mental health conditions, poor physical health, and respiratory conditions, such as asthma.

Besides the toll on this community's health and financial stability, insurers also refuse to change their records to reflect the true nature of the patient. Many health insurance companies have refused to change the individual's name and gender on their records. This creates another obstacle for this community to receive care while feeling accepted.

==== Insurances Covering Gender Affirmative Care ====
Numerous insurances within the United States cover gender affirming care, which includes hormone replacement therapy (HRT) and surgery. However, this coverage is conditional and dependent on many factors, such as plan benefits, employer, and the state. In California most insurers are forbidden from banning gender affirming care coverage; however, insurers in other states don't have this restriction and can exclude coverage of gender affirming care. Each specific plan and policy will specify the coverage of gender affirming care. Most insurers covering gender affirming care will cover generic and FDA approved hormone replacement therapy. If a clinician recommends a brand name hormone replacement therapy, insurance will conditionally accept it based on recommendation, cost, policy, and healthcare needs.

Some insurers that cover gender affirming care include Anthem Blue Cross and Blue Shield, Cigna, Aetna, Medicare, Tricare and UnitedHealthcare.

In August 2026, the U.S. Centers for Medicare & Medicaid Services issued a final rule which bars federal Medicaid funding for certain gender-affirming procedures for those under 18 and federal Children’s Health Insurance Program (CHIP) funding for those under 19.

== Global access ==
Global access to healthcare across primary and secondary health settings remains fragmented for transgender people, with access and services highly dependent on a political administration's support for trans health in policy as well as globally-engrained health inequalities largely shaped by financial wealth inequalities such as the Global North and Global South divide.

=== Africa ===
==== South Africa ====
Access to transition care, mental care, and other issues affecting transgender people is very limited; there is only one comprehensive transgender health care clinic available in South Africa. Additionally, the typical lack of access to transition options that comes as a result of gatekeeping is compounded by the relatively limited knowledge of transgender topics among psychiatrists and psychologists in South Africa.

=== Asia ===
==== Thailand ====
Sex reassignment operations (gender-affirming surgery) have been performed in Thailand since 1975, and Thailand is among the most popular destinations globally for patients seeking such operations. Puberty blockers and cross sex hormones are also available to minors in Thailand. Transgender people are quite common in Thai popular entertainment, television shows and nightclub performances, however, transgender people lack various legal rights compared to the rest of the population, and may face discrimination from society.

Transgender women, known as kathoeys, have access to hormones through non-prescription sources. This kind of access is a result of the low availability and expense of transgender health care clinics. However, transgender men have difficulty gaining access to hormones such as testosterone in Thailand because it is not as readily available as hormones for kathoeys. As a result, just a third of all trans men surveyed are taking hormones to transition whereas almost three quarters of kathoeys surveyed are taking hormones.

==== Mainland China ====
A 2017 report conducted by Beijing LGBT Center and Peking University showed that out of 1279 of its respondents who wanted to receive hormone treatment, 71% of them felt that it was "difficult", "very difficult", or "virtually impossible" to acquire safe and reliable information about gender affirming medications and receive hormonal replacement therapy with the guidance of a doctor. As a result, 66% of the respondents chose "online" and 51% chose "friends" as one of their sources for hormone replacement therapy medications. Gender reassignment surgeries were reported to be similarly inaccessible, with 89.1% of the respondents who have the needs for such surgeries unable to pursue them.

On December 1, 2022, the Chinese National Medical Products Administration banned online sales of cyproterone acetate, estradiol, and testosterone, which are the most common hormones and antiandrogens used in transgender hormone replacement therapy.

=== Europe ===
==== Spain ====
Public health care services are available for transgender individuals in Spain, although there has been debate over whether certain procedures should be covered under the public system. The region of Andalusia was the first to approve sex reassignment procedures, including sex reassignment surgery and mastectomies, in 1999, and several other regions have followed their lead in the following years. Multiple interdisciplinary clinics exist in Spain to cater specifically to diagnosing and treating transgender patients, including the Andalusian Gender Team. As of 2013, over 4000 transgender patients had been treated in Spain, including Spaniards and international patients.

Beginning in 2007, Spain has begun allowing transgender individuals who are eighteen years or older to change their name and gender identity on public records and documents if they have been receiving hormone replacement therapy for at least two years.

==== Sweden ====
In 1972, Sweden introduced a law that made it possible to change a person's legal gender, but in order to do that, transgender individuals were required to be sterilized and were not allowed to save any sperm or eggs. Apart from this, there were no other mandatory surgeries required for legal gender change. In 1999, people who had been forcibly sterilized in Sweden were entitled to compensation. However, the sterilization requirement remained for people who changed their legal gender. In January 2013, forced sterilization was banned in Sweden.

Depending on the person's health and wishes there are several different treatments and surgeries available. Today, no form of treatment is mandatory. Although to access medical and legal transitional treatment (e.g. hormone replacement therapy, and top surgery to enhance or remove breast tissue), the person will need to be diagnosed with transexualism or gender dysphoria, which requires at least one year of therapy, during which they must live for one full year as their desired gender in all professional, social, and personal matters. Gender clinics are recommended to provide male-to-female patients with wigs and breast prostheses for the endeavor. The evaluation additionally involves, if possible, meetings with family members and/or other individuals close to the patient. Patients may be denied care for any number of "psychosocial dimensions", including their choice of job or their marital status.

An individual with a transsexual or gender dysphoria diagnosis can, together with the assessment team and other doctors, decide what suits them. Medically transitioning in Sweden is covered by the high-cost protection for medications and doctor's visits, and there is no surgery fee. The fee the individual pays for a doctor's appointment or other care represents only a small fraction of the actual costs.

If a person would like to change their legal gender marker and personal identity number they will have to seek permission from the National Board of Health and Welfare. For non-binary persons younger than 18 years, the healthcare is limited. These individuals do not have access to a legal gender marker change or bottom surgery.

In Sweden, anyone is allowed to change their name at any time, including for gender transition.

Up until January 27, 2017, being transsexual was classed as a disease. Two months earlier, on November 21, 2016, around 50 trans activists broke into and occupied the Swedish National Board of Health and Welfare (Swedish: Socialstyrelsen) premises in Rålambsvägen in Stockholm. The activists demanded that their voices be heard regarding the way the country, healthcare, and the National Board of Health and Welfare mistreat transgender and intersex individuals.

Sweden's Karolinska Institute, administrator of the second-largest hospital system in the country, announced in March 2021 that it would discontinue providing puberty blockers or cross-sex hormones to children under 16. Additionally, the Karolinska Institute changed its policy to cease providing puberty blockers or cross-sex hormones to teenagers 16–18, outside of approved clinical trials. On 22 February 2022, Sweden's National Board of Health and Welfare said that puberty blockers should only be used in "exceptional cases" and said that their use is backed by "uncertain science".

However, other providers in Sweden continue to provide puberty blockers, and a clinician's professional judgment determines what treatments are recommended or not recommended. Youth are able to access gender-affirming care when doctors deem it medically necessary. The treatment is not banned in Sweden and is offered as part of its national healthcare service.

==== Netherlands ====
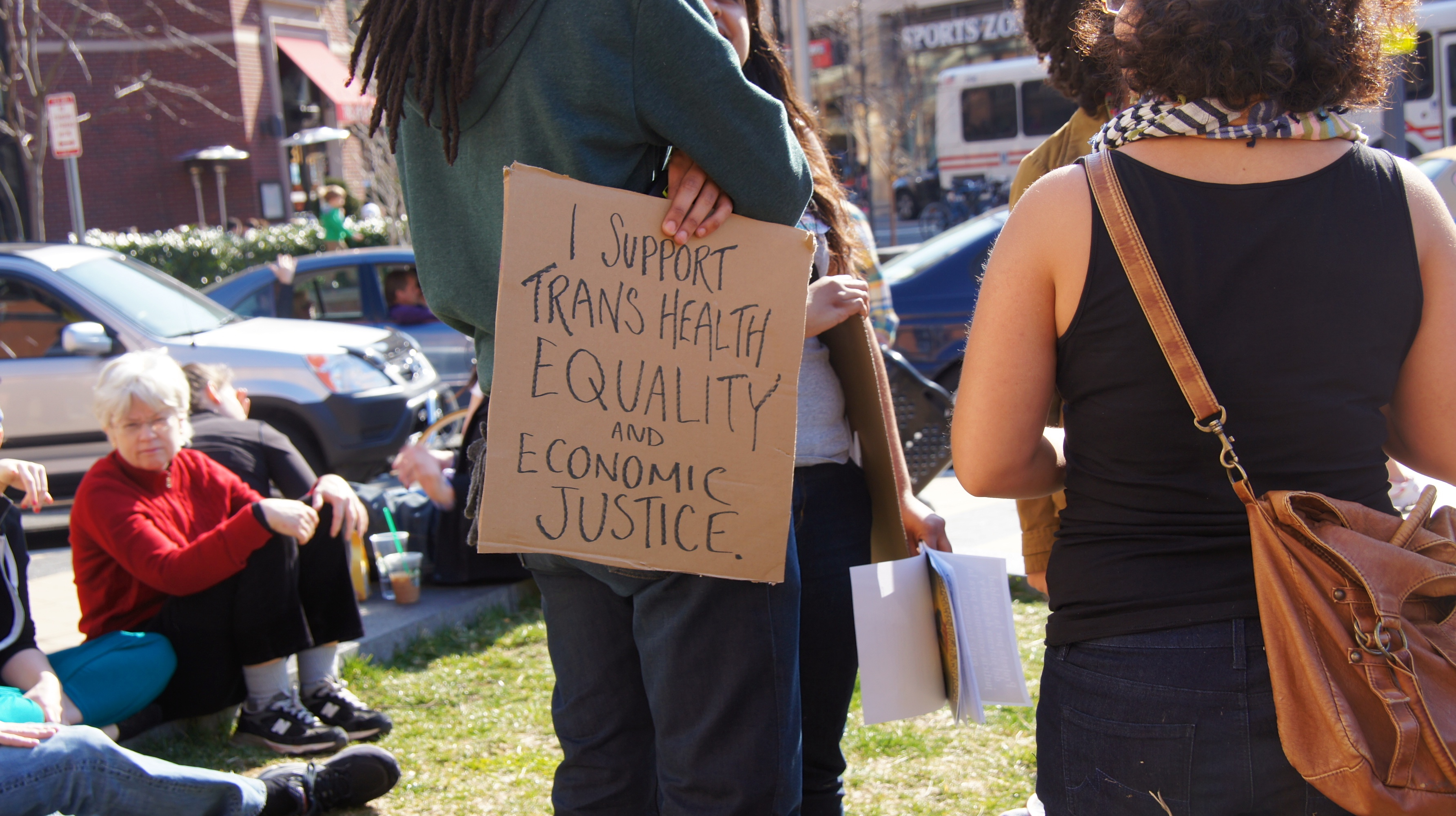
A sign at a rally calling for equal access to health care for transgender people

Gender care in the Netherlands is insured under the national health care of third part insurer's, including laser hair removal, SRS, facial feminization surgery and hormones. Hormones can be prescribed by licensed endocrinologist in an academic hospital from the age 16 and older. Blockers can be prescribed from age 12 when puberty usually starts.

The Dutch Ministry of Health, Welfare and Sport publishes guidelines recommending the use of puberty blockers in transgender adolescents of at least Tanner Stage II with informed consent and approval of an endocrinologist. This guideline, published in 2016, is endorsed by the following Dutch medical organizations:

- Nederlands Internisten Vereniging (Dutch Internists Association)
- Nederlands Huisartsen Genootschap (Dutch Society of General Practitioners)
- Nederlands Instituut van Psychologen (Dutch Institute of Psychologists)
- Nederlandse Vereniging voor Kindergeneeskunde (Dutch Association for Pediatrics)
- Nederlandse Vereniging voor Obstetrie & Gynaecologie (Dutch Association for Obstetrics & Gynaecology)
- Nederlandse Vereniging voor Plastische Chirurgie (Dutch Association for Plastic Surgery)
- Nederlandse Vereniging voor Psychiatrie (Dutch Psychiatry Association)
- Transvisie (Transvision, a patient organization for transgender patients)

==== United Kingdom ====
In 1999, the High Court ruled in favor of three transgender women in the case North West Lancashire Health Authority v A, D and G. The transgender women sued the North West Lancashire Health Authority after being denied gender reassignment surgery from 1996 to 1997. The judgement was the first time that transgender surgical operations had been tested in an open court in the United Kingdom and was described by Stephen Lodge (the solicitor representing the three women) as a "landmark in the continuing struggle for legal recognition" of transgender rights in Britain. The ruling means that it is illegal for any health authority in England or Wales to put a blanket ban on gender-affirming surgery relating to transgender people.

A 2013 survey of gender identity clinic services provided by the UK National Health Service (NHS) found that 94% of transgender people using the gender identity clinics were satisfied with their care and would recommend the clinics to a friend or family member. This study focused on transgender people using the NHS clinics and so was prone to survivorship bias, as those unhappy with the NHS service are less likely to use it. Despite this positive response, however, other National Health Service programs are lacking; almost a third of respondents reported inadequate psychiatric care in their local area. The options available from the National Health Service also vary with location; slightly differing protocols are used in England, Scotland, Wales and Northern Ireland. Protocols and available options differ widely outside of the UK.

In 2018 Stonewall described UK transgender healthcare as having "significant barriers to accessing treatment, including waiting times that stretch into years, far exceeding the maximums set by law for NHS patients". Patients have the legal right to begin treatment within 18 weeks of referral by their GP, however the average wait for patients to gender identity clinics was 18 months in 2020 with over 13,000 people on the waiting list for appointments at gender identity clinics.

As of May 2024, prescription of puberty blockers to new patients under 18 for the treatment of gender dysphoria is banned for both private medical practices (by a law in parliament in May) and the official state healthcare National Health Service (NHS) which stopped their use earlier, in the aftermath of the Cass Review except for use in clinical research trials.

Previously, on 30 June 2020, the NHS changed its website, replacing the statement that puberty blockers were "fully reversible" and that "treatment can usually be stopped at any time"; with "little is known about the long-term side effects of hormone or puberty blockers in children with gender dysphoria".

The Bell v Tavistock decision by the High Court of Justice for England and Wales ruled children under 16 were not competent to give informed consent to puberty blockers, but this was overturned by the Court of Appeal in September 2021.

In 2022, the British Medical Association opposed restrictions on puberty blockers, and the NHS restricted their use for children under 16 years of age to centrally administered clinical research.

In April 2024, the Cass Review stated that there was inadequate evidence to justify the widespread use of puberty blockers for gender dysphoria, and that more research was needed to provide evidence as to the effectiveness of this treatment, in terms of reducing distress and improving psychological functioning. This led to a de facto moratorium of the routine provision of puberty blockers for gender dysphoria within NHS England and NHS Scotland outside of clinical trials, and a subsequent ban private prescription of puberty blockers in the United Kingdom.

Children already receiving puberty blockers via NHS England will be able to continue their treatment. In England, a clinical trial into puberty blockers is planned for early 2025.

In July 2024, the Royal College of General Practitioners stated that for patients under 18, no general practitioner should prescribe puberty blockers outside of a clinical trial, and the prescription of gender-affirming hormones should be left to specialists. They affirmed they will fully implement the Cass Review recommendations.

===== Scotland =====
There are four NHS Scotland Gender Identity Clinics providing services to adults and a separate service for younger people. The National Gender Identity Clinical Network for Scotland reported in 2021 that some patients had waited in excess of two years from referral for their first appointment. Minister for Public Health Maree Todd has stated that the Scottish Government wants to reduce "unacceptable waits to access gender identity services". Research has indicated patient dissatisfaction with long wait times. However, overall experience of treatment outcomes was largely positive, particularly for hormone therapy and surgery.

=== North America ===
==== Canada ====
A study of transgender Ontario residents aged 16 and over, published in 2016, found that half of them were reluctant to discuss transgender issues with their family doctor. A 2013–2014 nationwide study of young transgender and genderqueer Canadians found that a third of younger (ages 14–18) and half of the older (ages 19–25) respondents missed needed physical health care. Only 15 percent of respondents with a family doctor felt very comfortable discussing transgender issues with them.

All Canadian provinces fund some sex reassignment surgeries, with New Brunswick being the last of the provinces to start insuring these procedures in 2016. Waiting times for surgeries can be lengthy, as few surgeons in the country provide them; a clinic in Montreal is the only one providing a full range of procedures. Insurance coverage is not generally provided for the transition-related procedures of facial feminization surgery, tracheal shave, or laser hair removal. And in January 2024, The Alberta government of Danielle Smith announced plans to ban gender affirming surgeries for minors under the age of 18 and hormones and puberty blockers for minors under the age of 16.

According to the Canadian Pediatric Society, "Current evidence shows puberty blockers to be safe when used appropriately, and they remain an option to be considered within a wider view of the patient's mental and psychosocial health."

==== Mexico ====
A July 2016 study in The Lancet Psychiatry reported that nearly half of transgender people surveyed undertook body-altering procedures without medical supervision. Transition-related care is not covered under Mexico's national health plan. Only one public health institution in Mexico provides free hormones for transgender people. Health care for transgender Mexicans focuses on HIV and prevention of other sexually transmitted diseases.

The Lancet study also found that many transgender Mexicans have physical health problems due to living on the margins of society. The authors of the study recommended that the World Health Organization declassify transgender identity as a mental disorder, to reduce stigma against this population.

In June 2020, the Mexican federal government released "The Protocol for Access without Discrimination to Health Care Services for Lesbian, Gay, Bisexual, Transsexual, Transvestite, Transgender, and Intersex Persons and Specific Care Guidelines." The guidelines are used in healthcare facilities administered by the government. The guidelines state that the process of identifying one's sexual orientation, gender identify and/or expression can occur at early ages. Thus, the guidelines recommend that medical facilities and doctors consider the use of puberty blockers and cross-sex hormones as a treatment for transgender minors when appropriate. In addition to the guidelines, multiple Mexican states have modified their civil codes to recognize gender-affirming healthcare as a right for transgender people under the age of eighteen.

==== United States ====
Transgender people face various kinds of discrimination, especially in health care situations. An assessment of transgender needs in Philadelphia found that 26% of respondents had been denied health care because they were transgender and 52% of respondents had difficulty accessing health services. Aside from transition related care, transgender and gender non-conforming individuals need preventive care such as vaccines, gynecological care, prostate exams, and other annual preventive health measures. Various factors play a role in creating the limited access to care, such as insurance coverage issues related to their legal gender identity status.

The Affordable Care Act (commonly known as Obamacare) marketplace has improved access to insurance for the LGBTQ community through anti-discriminatory measures, such as not allowing insurance companies to reject consumers for being transgender. However, insurance sold outside of the ACA marketplace does not have to follow these requirements. This means that preventive care, such as gynecological exams for transgender men, may not be covered.

Starting in the early-2020s, as many as 13 U.S. states banned gender affirming health care for transgender youth, with several states further restricting treatment for adults as well. In January 2024, several Republican legislators have expressed their desire to ban gender-affirming healthcare altogether.

=== South America ===
==== Brazil ====
Processo transexualizador (English: Transsexualization process) is a set of procedures and forms of care provided to the LGBTQ community in Brazil. It includes a complex of multidisciplinary services and forms of care offered by the Unified Health System (SUS), directed toward the care of this population who wish to make changes to their physical bodies and sexual characteristics. These also include assistance to enable the use of a social name, and psychological support among others. It was established in August 2008, and later expanded in November 2013.

==== Colombia ====
Transgender women sex workers have cited financial difficulties as barriers to accessing physical transition options. As a result, they have entered sex work to relieve financial burdens, both those related to transition and those not related to transition. However, despite working in the sex trade, the transgender women are at low risk for HIV transmission as the Colombian government requires education about sexual health and human rights for sex workers to work in so-called tolerance zones, areas where sex work is legal.

== For transgender youth ==
Transition options for transgender adolescents and youth are significantly limited compared to those for transgender adults. Prepubescent transgender youth can go through various social changes, such as presenting as their gender and asking to be called by a different name or different pronouns. Medical options for transition become available once the child begins to enter puberty. Under close supervision by a team of doctors, puberty blockers may be used to limit the effects of puberty.

Discrimination has a significant effect on the mental health of young transgender people. The lack of family acceptance, rejection in schools and abuse from peers can be powerful stressors, leading to poor mental health and substance abuse. A study done on transgender youth in San Francisco found that higher rates of both transgender-based and racial bias are associated with increased rates of depression, post-traumatic stress disorder, and suicidal ideation. The Swiss National Advisory Commission on Biomedical Ethics (NCE) has suggested that research into treatments for gender-incongruent and gender-diverse young people should routinely consider the impact of social factors, including discrimination and social support, when analyzing their results.

In a 2018 review, evidence suggested that hormonal treatments for transgender adolescents can achieve their intended physical effects. The mental effects of GnRH modifiers are positive with treatment associated with significant improvements in multiple psychological measures, including global functioning, depression, and overall behavioral and/or emotional problems. In a two-year study published in January 2023, Chen et al. found that gender-affirming hormones for transgender and non-binary youth "improved appearance congruence and psychosocial functioning". Another study analyzing Dutch transgender youth completed by Catharina van der Loos et al. found that 98% of participants who started gender-affirming hormone treatment in youth continued using said treatment into adulthood.

In February 2024, the American Psychological Association approved a policy statement supporting unobstructed access to health care and evidence-based clinical care for transgender, gender-diverse, and nonbinary children, adolescents, and adults, as well as opposing state bans and policies intended to limit access to such care.

In May 2025, a two-year systematic review commissioned by the state of Utah as part of a ban on trans youth healthcare concluded that "The consensus of the evidence supports that the treatments are effective in terms of mental health, psychosocial outcomes, and the induction of body changes consistent with the affirmed gender in pediatric [gender dysphoria] patients. The evidence also supports that the treatments are safe in terms of changes to bone density, cardiovascular risk factors, metabolic changes, and cancer". The review's findings were thereafter dismissed by the Utah state legislature, who kept the ban in place.

At their annual meeting in summer 2026, the American Medical Association's House of Delegates passed a new policy formally and explicitly supporting gender-affirming care for minors, including surgeries.

== For transgender older adults ==
Transgender older adults can encounter challenges in the access and quality of care received in health care systems and nursing homes, where providers may be ill-prepared to provide culturally sensitive care to trans people. Trans individuals face the risk of aging with more limited support and in more stigmatizing environments than heteronormative individuals. Despite the rather negative picture portrayed by medical literature in relation to the depression and isolation that many transgender people encounter at earlier stages of life, some studies found testimonies of older LGBTQ adults relating feelings of inclusion, comfort and community support.

For transgender older adults seeking gender-affirming hormonal therapy, data on the health impacts of masculinizing and feminizing therapies in the older population is limited. Testosterone and estrogen levels reduce with age, and sex hormone levels and advanced age have each been identified as risk factors for cancers, cardiovascular disease, and other disease states. Further investigation is needed to assess the risks and benefits of GAHT in older adults.

== See also ==
- European Network for the Investigation of Gender Incongruence (ENIGI)
- Healthcare and the LGBTQ community
- Standards of Care for the Health of Transsexual, Transgender, and Gender Nonconforming People
- Study of Transition, Outcomes, and Gender (STRONG)
- Transgender § Healthcare
- Transgender clinic
- Transgender health care misinformation
