= Schutter (surname) =

Schutter or de Schutter is a surname. Notable people with the surname include:

== Schutter ==
- David Schutter (1940–2005), American lawyer
- Eltjo Schutter (born 1953), Dutch decathlete

== de Schutter ==
- Bart De Schutter, Belgian legal scholar and academic administrator
- Bob De Schutter (born 1981), Belgian video game designer and academic
- Charles De Schutter (born 1975), Belgian music producer
- Margriet Nienke de Schutter (born 1986), Dutch sports journalist
- Niels De Schutter (born 1988), Belgian footballer
- Olivier De Schutter (born 1968), Belgian legal scholar

== See also ==
- Schutter (disambiguation)
- Schütter, a surname
