= VUMC =

VUMC may refer to:

- Vanderbilt University Medical Center, in Nashville, Tennessee.
- VU University Medical Center, in Amsterdam, The Netherlands.
