= Goudsmit =

Goudsmit is a surname. Notable people with the surname include:

- Samuel Goudsmit (1902–1978), Dutch-American physicist
- Lex Goudsmit (1913–1999), Dutch actor
- Jaap Goudsmit (born 1951), Dutch scientist

== See also ==
- 9688 Goudsmit, a meteor
