= Helga (Elga) De Vries =

Dutch neuroimmunologist

- Born: Amsterdam
- Education: Leiden University; University College London
- Known for: Blood brain barrier and neurological disease
- Scientific career
- Fields: Neuroimmunology
- Workplaces: Amsterdam University Medical Centers

Helga (Elga) De Vries is a Dutch neuroimmunologist and a Full Professor in the Department of Molecular Cell Biology and Immunology at Amsterdam University Medical Centers in Amsterdam, The Netherlands. De Vries is a leader in the field of blood brain barrier research, and founded the Dutch Blood Brain Barrier Network. She is also the President of the International Brain Barrier Society. De Vries’ research explores the interactions between the brain and the immune system, specifically looking at neurovascular biology in the context of neurodegenerative diseases such as multiple sclerosis and Alzheimer's Disease.

== Early life and education ==
De Vries was born in The Netherlands. In 1990, she began her graduate studies in pharmacology at Leiden University in Leiden, The Netherlands. She graduated in 1995 and pursued postdoctoral training at University College London in the United Kingdom with the support of a Marie-Curie Fellowship.

== Career and research ==
After completing her postdoctoral research, De Vries received the VIDI grant from the Dutch research council (NWO), which supported her in starting her own lab in Amsterdam at the Amsterdam University Medical Centers (Universitair Medische Centra). De Vries holds the title of Full Professor in the Department of Molecular Cell Biology and Immunology. As the principal investigator of a lab, she focuses her research program on brain-immune interactions in the context of neurological diseases. She investigates how blood brain barrier disruptions impact the immune cells in the brain, and how neurovascular biology impacts the inflammatory state of the brain. Her research has led to novel insights into the role of blood brain interactions in Multiple Sclerosis and Alzheimer's Disease., finding that alterations of the neurovascular unit precipitate neurodegenerative diseases. These diseases are also marked by plaque deposits in brain vasculature, which impacts brain homeostasis and disease progression.

De Vries is a leader in the field of neuroimmunology and neurovascular interactions. She leads and directs multiple national and international groups to support collaboration and scientific discoveries in Blood Brain Barrier research and neuroimmunology research towards finding treatments for disease. De Vries is a member of the management team at the Multiple Sclerosis Centrum Amsterdam, was the chair of the 2011 Cerebral Vascular Biology Meeting held in Leiden, The Netherlands, and was elected to the International Brain Barriers Society council in 2013. In 2015, she founded Brendinn Therapeutics (Brain Endothelial Innovation) and serves as chair to oversee translational and clinical innovations in treating brain diseases through targeting brain-vascular interactions. To promote research on the blood brain barrier, De Vries, along with fellow Dutch colleagues, founded the Dutch Blood Brain Barrier Network (BBBNedwork). De Vries also promotes and leads blood brain barrier research on the international scale and was recently elected as the President of the International Brain Barrier Society.

=== MicroRNAs in blood brain barrier regulation ===
The blood brain barrier (BBB) is critical to controlling the homeostasis of the central nervous system. Small changes to BBB permeability due to damage or disease can be severely detrimental to brain health, and changes in BBB have been implicated in various neurological diseases. De Vries and her colleagues discovered the importance of microRNAs in BBB function, finding that the microRNA miR-125a-5p seemed to play a key role in regulating brain-endothelial tightness and immune cell migration into the brain. This microRNA also appeared to be decreased in the brains of patients with multiple sclerosis (MS). Their findings suggest that targeting microRNAs to repair a leaky BBB in disease might hold promise as a novel treatment approach for diseases like MS.

=== Multiple sclerosis ===
De Vries has conducted extensive research into the mechanisms of MS pathogenesis, as well as novel ways it could be treated. In 2007, De Vries explored the potential of targeting reactive oxygen species as a therapy for MS, since oxidation is known to precipitate and contribute to MS pathogenesis. De Vries proposed antioxidant therapy as a potential form of treatment for MS to inhibit the development or progression of the disease.

Since sphingolipid metabolism had been shown to be implicated in various neurological disorders, De Vries probed how alterations to the sphingolipid, ceramide, alter disease processes. She found that, in the brains of MS patients, astrocytes were the main producers of ceramide. De Vries showed that using Fingolimod could reduce the production of pro-inflammatory lipids by activated astrocytes in MS and serve as a potential therapy.

Interestingly, De Vries' work has also shown the beneficial side of astrocytes in neuroinflammation. Astrocytes produce retinoic acid, which acts as an endogenous anti-inflammatory compound protecting the BBB from degradation and harm due to inflammation.

=== Cell migration into brain ===
Much of De Vries' work has also focused on how the BBB is involved in immune cell trafficking to the brain. She has found that much of the pathogenesis in MS is caused by CD4 T-cells trafficking across the brain endothelium, and her work highlighted the mechanisms underlying this trafficking. When myelin is being degraded inside the brain, brain endothelial cells act as antigen presenting cells through presenting myelin-derived antigens in MHC-II to T-cells in the periphery. De Vries’ discovery of a fundamental role of endothelial cells in promoting T-cell infiltration in MS was critical in establishing the antigen presentation capacity of the blood brain barrier.

De Vries later found that monocyte diapedesis into the brain during inflammation is mediated by tissue-type plasminogen activator (tPA). Continuing to probe the ways that immune cells infiltrate the brain, De Vries found that the NMDA receptor subunit 1 is expressed on the endothelial cells lining the BBB and is involved in regulating tPA, which permits the entry of monocytes from the periphery into the CNS.

In a following study, De Vries probed the biology of macrophage infiltration into the CNS. She found that activation status played a critical role on the effects of the chemoattractant properties of cytokines. Her work laid the foundation to further understand how activation affects macrophage migration into the CNS both in health and disease.

== Awards and honors ==
- Elected President of the International Brain Barrier Society
- 2011 Chair of Cerebral Vascular Biology Meeting in Leiden

== Select publications ==
- Troletti C, Lopes Pinheiro MA, Charabati M, Gowing E2, van Het Hof B1, van der Pol SMA, Geerts D, Prat A, Fontijn RD, Unger WW, de Vries HE. Notch signaling is impaired during inflammation in a Lunatic Fringe-dependent manner . Brain Behav Immun . 2018 Mar; 69: 48–56. doi: 10.1016 / j.bbi.2017.12.016. Epub 2017 Dec 28.
- Lopes Pinheiro MA, Garcia-Vallejo JJ, van het Hof B, Wierts L, O'Toole T, Verstege M, van der Pol SM, van Kooyk Y, de Vries HE, Unger WW. Uptake, processing and presentation of myelin-derived antigens by brain endothelial cells facilitates antigen-specific T cell migration . Elife Sciences : 2016; 5: e13149. DOI: 10.7554 / eLife.13149
- Mizee MR, Nijland PG, van der Pol SM, Drexhage JA, van Het Hof B, Mebius R, van der Valk P, van Horssen J, Reijerkerk A, de Vries HE. Astrocyte-derived retinoic acid: a novel regulator of blood-brain barrier function in multiple sclerosis . ACTA Neuropathologica 2014 128: 691-703
- Kooij G, Kopplin K, Blasig R, Penny M, King N, Goverse G, van der Pol SM, van Het Hof B, Gollasch M, Drexhage JA, Reijerkerk A, Meij IC, Mebius R, Willnow TE, Müller D, Blasig IE, de Vries HE. Disturbed function of the blood-cerebrospinal fluid barrier aggravates neuro-inflammation. ACTA Neuropathol 2014; 128: 267–277.
- Carrano A, Snkhchyan H, Kooij G, van der Pol S, van Horssen J, Veerhuis R, Hoozemans J, Rozemuller A, de Vries HE. ABC transporters P-gp and BCRP are reduced in capillary cerebral amyloid angiopathy . Neurobiol Aging . 2014; 35: 565-75
- Reijerkerk A, Lopez-Ramirez MA, van Het Hof B, Drexhage JA, Kamphuis WW, Kooij G, Vos JB, van der Pouw Kraan TC, van Zonneveld AJ, Horrevoets AJ, Prat A, Romero IA, de Vries HE. MicroRNAs at the inflamed brain endothelial cell barrier, implications for multiple sclerosis . J Neuroscience 2013, 33: 6857-6863
