= Middle Sexes: Redefining He and She =

2005 American television film

- Directed by: Antony Thomas
- Narrated by: Gore Vidal
- Theme music composer: Dimitri Tchamouroff
- Country of origin: United States
- Original language: English

Production
- Producers: Carleen L. Hsu; Antony Thomas
- Cinematography: Jonathan Partridge
- Editor: McDonald Brown
- Running time: 75 minutes

Original release
- Release: 2005

Middle Sexes: Redefining He and She is a 2005 American television documentary film by Antony Thomas.

== Plot summary ==
The documentary explores the issue of gender and sex, beginning with transgender women dancing at a nightclub. The murder of Gwen Araujo, a teenage trans woman, is described in detail by the narrator. Several acquaintances had killed her after finding out that Araujo was born male because two of them had had sexual relations with her.

Two trans women, Calpernia Addams and Andrea James, speak about the members of their community being brutally murdered for being transgender. Addams then tells the audience about her boyfriend, Barry Winchell, who was harassed and eventually murdered by a fellow soldier for dating a transgender woman. James talks about her life as a lesbian transgender woman.

How sex is developed in the womb is explained by the narrator and James Pfaus, a professor at Concordia University. More about how sex develops is discussed between each of the stories.

Max Beck, an Intersex person, tells the story of how he was born with ambiguous genitalia and then assigned female at birth. He was raised with many operations for which he did not know the reason until he found out that he was classified as a male pseudohermaphrodite at birth. He eventually transitioned to using the name Max and male pronouns, but still identifies as more an intersex person then a man. Max now is married with a daughter.

The next story told is about the intersex condition of Maria José Martínez-Patiño, a former Olympic hurdler, who was banned from competition after a test showed her to have XY (male) chromosomes. She eventually won her medals back and was allowed to compete as a woman after a long legal battle. There are no more chromosome tests in the Olympic Games; however, gender verification in sports remains contentious.

Next, eight-year-old Noah is introduced. Noah is biologically male and living as boy, but prefers things that are typically for girls. His father, mother, and step-father all share their concerns for Noah's future in their small Midwestern town.

In a Dutch institute of brain research, scientists are trying to learn about the differences between sex and gender. They found differences in the brains of transgender people from cisgender people of their birth sex.

The documentary then looks at different treatment of gender-variant and people of different sexualities across cultures and history.

In India, older teenage boys dance at weddings in a way that might get them labelled as homosexuals, and sometimes have sex, at other times. An Indian man, Vijay, and his wife are introduced. The fact that Vijay lives a double life with a male partner of twelve years is revealed. Vijay's wife doesn't know about this, and he feels guilty because he was forced into an arranged marriage. But in the Hindu religion, it was once considered natural to have a different sexuality until British colonization. India still have hijras, a group of people who are a type of third gender. They go through a now-illegal operation to remove their male-assigned genitalia.

In Bangkok, Thailand the audience meets a transgender model who will be getting married soon. In Buddhism, it is believed everyone will be a transgender person at one point because they believe in reincarnation. More Thai transgender women, called Kathoey, are introduced. One is in a relationship with a Texan man who was married and had children. The woman in her early twenties must support her mother and grandmother because her father has died.

A story is told of heterosexual college men who were shown gay pornography. Their physical response was measured. Men who were considered homophobic were more aroused, but claimed they had no reaction. This then goes back to Gwen Araujo, who was killed by two men who were insecure about their sexualities because they had sexual relations with her. All of this supports the theory that people are more likely to get angry at sex, gender, and sexuality differences because they are insecure about their own sexuality or gender identity.

== Cast ==
- Gore Vidal as narrator
- Calpernia Addams as herself
- Max Beck as himself
- Milton Diamond as himself (as Professor Milton Diamond)
- Alice Dreger as herself (as Dr. Alice Dreger)
- Anne Fausto-Sterling as herself
- Louis Gooren as himself
- Andrea James as herself
- Shivananda Khan as himself
- James Pfaus as himself (as Dr. James Pfaus)
- Joan Roughgarden as herself
- A.W. Richard Sipe as himself
- Gloria Wekker as herself

== Awards and honors ==
The film was nominated for a 2006 GLAAD Media Award for Outstanding Documentary.

== International airing ==
When airing in Sweden TV3, the title was given as Straight.
