= Margriet Nienke de Schutter =

International media personality

Personal information
- Full name: Margriet Nienke de Schutter
- Nationality: Dutch
- Born: 1986 April 28 Groningen, The Netherlands
- Education: Hanze University
- Website: secretbalanceofchampions.com, extopsporter.nl

Sport
- Sport: Short Track Speed Skating

Margriet Nienke de Schutter (born April 28, 1986, in Groningen) is an international media personality from The Netherlands and a former ice-skating competitor. She works as a motivational speaker, reporter, achor, interviewer, author, filmmaker, emcee, and sports journalist.

== Biography ==
=== Education ===
De Schutter attended Hanze University in Groningen, obtaining a Bachelor’s in science degree (B.S.) in International Communication with a minor in Conflict Management and a specialization in Media and Journalism. As a student, De Schutter undertook screenwriting at the Dutch Northern Film Festival in Leeuwarden in 2010. She won the festival’s Screenplay Award. This prize resulted in working with filmmaker Ismael Lotz and producer Thom Verheul, to accomplish the documentary 'Diepgaan voor Vancouver' (Going Deep for Vancouver), which won an award at the FICTS Film Festival in Milan in 2012.

== Sports ==
=== Short track speed skating career ===
Margriet de Schutter was a member of the Dutch National Short Track Speed Skating Team. She is a five-time Dutch National Champion in the relay. In 2003 (Budapest), she represented the Netherlands at the ISU World Junior Short Track Speed Skating Championships. She finished fourth in the relay during the ISU Short Track World Cup. She retired from elite sports in February 2010.

== Sport results ==
Dutch National Championships (individual)
| 2000 | 's-Hertogenbosch | 5th (junior C) |
| 2001 | Groningen | 2nd (junior C) |
| 2002 | The Hague | 4th (junior B) |
| 2003 | Heerenveen | 2nd (junior B |
| 2004 | Groningen | 5th (junior A) |
| 2005 | Zoetermeer | 2nd (junior A) |
| 2006 | Heerenveen | 6th (senior) |
| 2007 | The Hague | 4th (senior) |
| 2008 | Amsterdam | 6th (senior) |
| 2009 | Zoetermeer | - |
| 2010 | Tilburg | 4th (senior) |

Dutch National Championships (relay)
| 2000 | 's-Hertogenbosch | 1st (junior) |
| 2001 | Groningen | 2nd (junior) |
| 2002 | The Hague | 1st (junior) |
| 2003 | Heerenveen | 1st (junior) |
| 2004 | Groningen | 2nd (junior) |
| 2005 | Zoetermeer | 1st (senior) |
| 2006 | Heerenveen | 1st (senior) |
| 2007 | The Hague | 1st (senior) |
| 2008 | Amsterdam | 1st (senior) |
| 2009 | Zoetermeer | - |
| 2010 | Tilburg | 1st (senior) |

World Junior Championships
| 2003 | Budapest | 32nd (individual 6th (relay) |
| 2005 | Belgrade | Substitute |

World Cups
| 2007 | Heerenveen | 14th (1000 meter individual) 17th (500 meter individual) 4th (relay) |
| 2008 | Beijing | 31st (500 meter individual) 28th (1500 meter individual) |
| 2008 | Nagano | 24th (1500 meter individual) 29th (1500 meter individual) |

== Career ==
After De Schutter's sports career, she transitioned into the media industry. As a sports journalist, De Schutter has worked for the speed skating news platform, Schaatsen.nl, and other sports-based entities.

De Schutter serves as a motivational speaker for international corporate entities. Her lectures address topics including mental health, coping with change, dealing with unexpected situations, and realigning goals.

De Schutter founded the Dutch online platform ‘Extopsporter.nl’, an online platform dedicated to life after elite sports, and authored the book ‘Stoppen & Doorgaan’ (Stop & Continue). In collaboration with medical researcher Vincent Gouttebarge and orthopedic surgeon Gino Kerkhoffs, she co-authored The Secret Balance of Champions – Health Challenges in Elite Sport in 2021

== Awards and honors ==
Awards and honors
| 2010 | Screenplay Award at the Northern Dutch Film Festival |
| 2012 | City of Talent Certificate awarded by the mayor of Groningen |
| 2012 | Hanze University’s Walk of Fame |
| 2012 | FICTS Film Festival Award |
| 2018 | Mention d’Honneur – FICTS |
| 2021 | Diamond d’Honneur - FICTS |
