= Vincent Gouttebarge =

French footballer (born 1975)

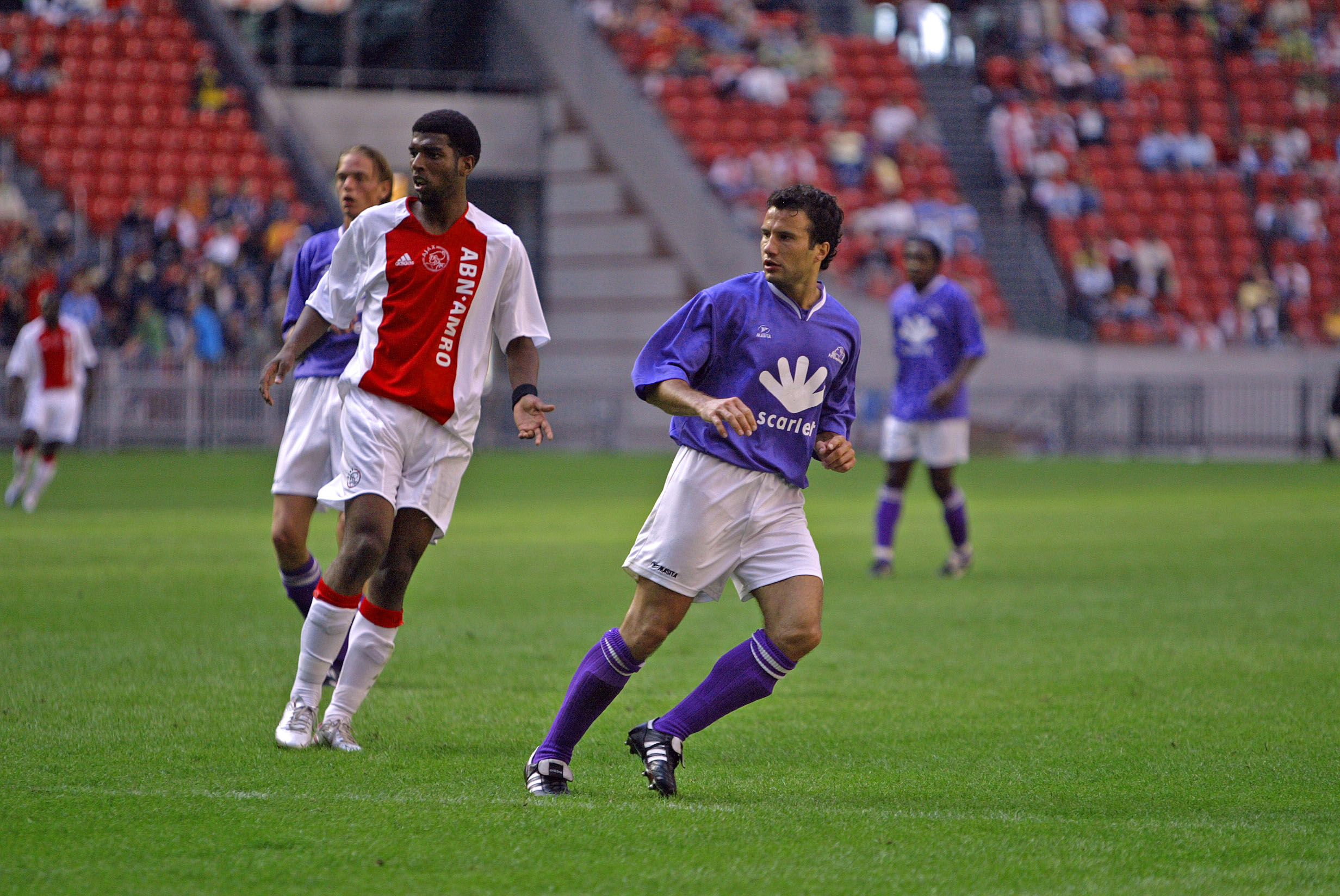

Personal information
- Date of birth: 16 August 1975 (age 51)
- Place of birth: Vichy, France
- Position: Defender

Youth career
- 1989–1993: RC Vichy

Senior career*
| Years | Team | Apps | (Gls) |
| 1993–1994 | Auxerre | 0 | (0) |
| 1994–1997 | Cournon-d'Auvergne | 76 | (0) |
| 1997–2001 | Volendam | 22 | (0) |
| 2002–2007 | Omniworld | 103 | (2) |
| Total | | 221 | (2) |
- * Club domestic league appearances and goals

Vincent Gouttebarge (born 16 August 1975) is a French former professional footballer who as of 2021 works as a medical scientist.

== Football career ==
Born in Vichy, Gouttebarge played football in France between 1993 and 1997 for AJ Auxerre and FC Cournon-d'Auvergne before moving to the Netherlands. There he played for FC Volendam and FC Omniworld ( now Almere City FC ). In 1997, Gouttebarge was the first Frenchman who played in the Dutch Premier League (Eredivisie). Due to severe injuries, Gouttebarge played only 232 games as a professional footballer between 1993 and 2007. The Frenchman, also the holder of a Dutch passport, announced early in the 2006/2007 season that he would stop playing professional football at the end of the season in order to concentrate on his academic career. His last game was in 2007 in the away match against AGOVV.

== Professional career ==
During his professional career, Gouttebarge studied sports science at the University Blaise Pascal in Clermont - Ferrand, and graduated in 2000 with a degree in exercise physiology. From 2002, Gouttebarge studied next to his football career at the Academic Medical Center / Faculty of Medicine at the University of Amsterdam. Gouttebarge wrote a PhD thesis on clinimetrics and earned his PhD degree in late 2008. As of 2021, Gouttebarge is extraordinary professor at the Section Sports Medicine of the University of Pretoria while working at the Orthopaedic Surgery department of the Amsterdam University Medical Centers. He is also chief medical officer at FIFPRO (Football Players Worldwide), the international union for professional footballers. Gouttebarge’s work focusses on a wide range of sports medicine domains being relevant in professional sports (emphasis on football), striving to protect and promote the physical, mental and social health of active and former professional athletes. Gouttebarge is chair of the International Olympic Committee (IOC) Mental Health Working Group, co-director of the IOC Programs on Mental Health in Elite Sport, member of the Concussion Expert Group of the International Football Association Board (The IFAB), member of the Medical Expert Group of the French Professional Football League (LFP), and member of the South African Sports Medicine Association (SASMA). Gouttebarge is also member of the editorial board of the South African Journal of Sports Medicine and Injury Epidemiology.
