= Schutter =

Schutter may refer to:

- Schutter (Kinzig), river in Germany, tributary of the Kinzig, Baden Württemberg
- Schutter (Danube), river in Germany, tributary of the Danube, Bavaria
- Schutter (surname), including a list of people with this name
