= Center of Expertise on Gender Dysphoria =

Transgender clinic in Netherlands

The Center of Expertise on Gender Dysphoria (CEGD), or the Kennis- en Zorgcentrum Genderdysforie (KZcG), is a transgender clinic at Amsterdam University Medical Centers, location VUmc in Amsterdam, Netherlands. It opened in 1975 and is one of the largest transgender clinics and research institutes in the world. Initially for adults only, from 1987 onwards, a practice dedicated to adolescents opened in Utrecht.^{:301} The children's clinic merged with the adult clinic in 2002, moving to Amsterdam.^{:301-302;} (Note: "The first specialized gender identity clinic for children and adolescents in the Netherlands opened its doors at the Utrecht University Medical Center in 1987. (...) In 2002, the clinic moved to the VU University Medical Center in Amsterdam and is now part of the Center of Expertise on Gender Dysphoria (Cohen-Kettenis & de Vries, 2012, pp. 301-302).")

As of 2021, it has treated about 10,000 transgender people since it opened almost 50 years previously. The clinic was first headed by Louis Gooren.

Hormone therapy for transgender women was initially done using high-dose estrogen therapy with oral estrogens. Progestogens were also sometimes included. The antiandrogen and progestogen cyproterone acetate was first used in transgender women by 1977. Its use was standard at the CEGD by 1985.

== See also ==
- European Network for the Investigation of Gender Incongruence (ENIGI)
- NHS Gender Identity Development Service
