= Schütter =

Schütter is a surname. Notable people with the surname include:

- David Schütter (born 1991), German actor
- Friedrich Schütter (1921–1995), German actor
- Meinrad Schütter (1910–2006), Swiss composer

== See also ==
- Schutter (surname)
