= Hanneke Schuitemaker =

Dutch virologist and researcher (born 1964)

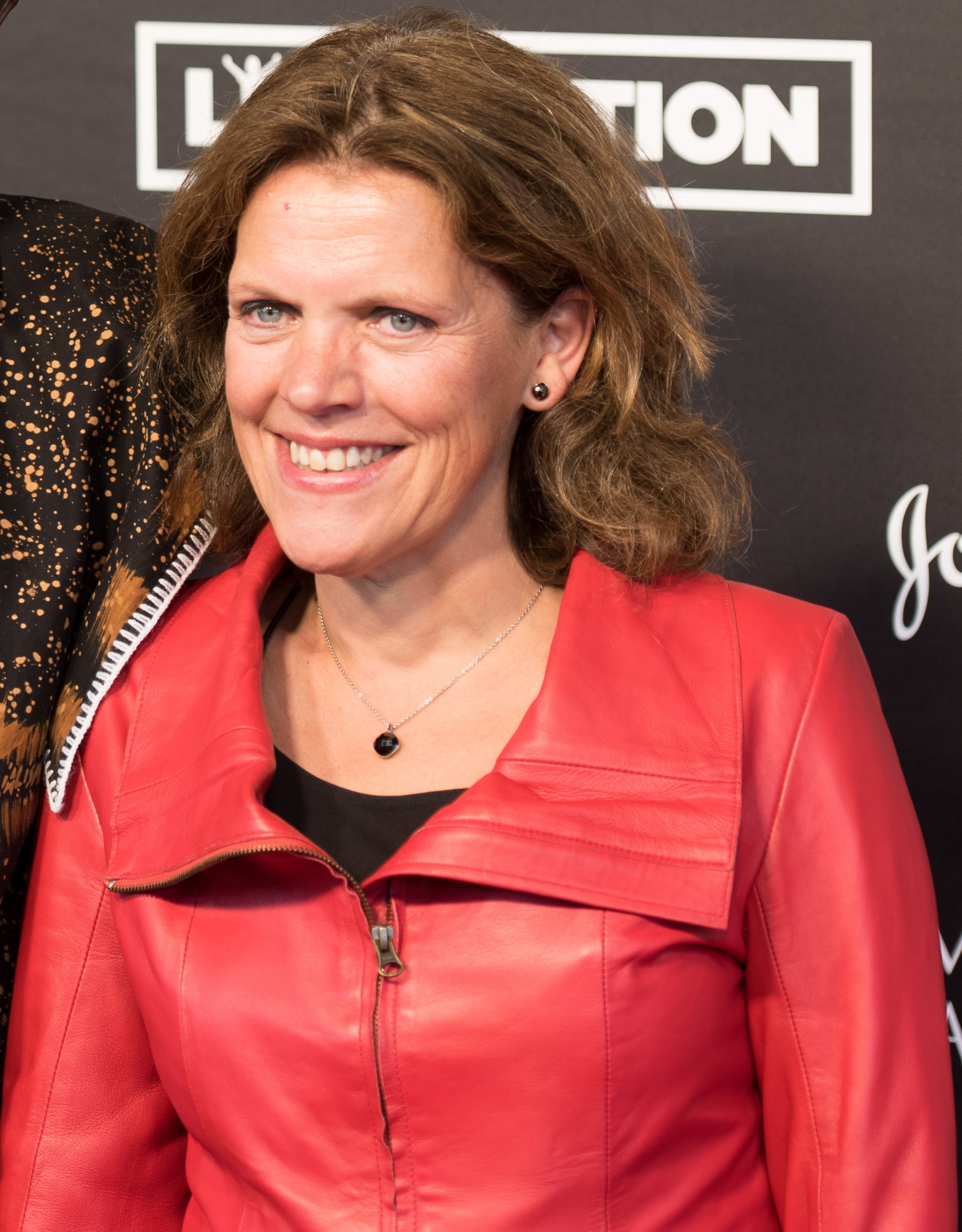
- Born: 1964 (age 61–62); Netherlands
- Scientific career
- Workplaces: University of Amsterdam; Sanquin; Amsterdam University Medical Centers; Crucell
- Thesis: Role of HIV-1 monocytotropism in AIDS pathogenesis (1992)

Hanneke Schuitemaker is a Dutch virologist, the Global Head of Viral Vaccine Discovery and Translational Medicine at Johnson & Johnson's Janssen Vaccines & Prevention, and a professor of virology at the Amsterdam University Medical Centers of the University of Amsterdam (since 2004). She has been involved in the development of Janssen's Ebola vaccine and is involved in the development of a universal flu vaccine, HIV vaccine, RSV vaccine and COVID-19 vaccine.

== Early life and education ==
Schuitemaker (1964) grew up in the Netherlands. Her mother was a bookkeeper and her father was an electrical engineer. As a child she was fascinated by medicine, and after earning her undergraduate degree she completed a PhD programme in AIDS pathogenesis at the University of Amsterdam.

== Research and career ==
Schuitemaker started to research HIV/AIDS in 1989. Whilst interested in the virus itself, Schuitemaker also wanted to learn more about the patients who suffered from the disease, and took part in a patient outreach program. Her interactions in this program strengthened her motivation to better understand the disease, help find a vaccine and treatments. She studied the pathogenesis of HIV-1 throughout her career. Her early research focussed on whether HIV could infect other cells in the body than just T cells, including cells in the brain and lungs. She started working at Sanquin, the Netherlands blood supply foundation based in Amsterdam, where she was made Head of the department of Clinical Viro-Immunology in 1998. Schuitemaker has been involved in policy, and has held advisory positions on several vaccine charities. From 2003 to 2004, she was a visiting scientist at the La Jolla Scripps Research Institute.

Schuitemaker joined the Academic Medical Center in Amsterdam in 2008, where she was made Chair of Experimental Immunology. She moved to Crucell in 2010, which, at the time, was an independent biotechnology company. Two weeks later, Crucell was acquired by Janssen Vaccines, part of Johnson & Johnson. She was appointed Global Head of Viral Vaccines Discovery and Translational Medicine. At Janssen, Schuitemaker worked on the universal flu vaccine. She returned to working on vaccinations to protect against HIV-1. Schuitemaker demonstrated the efficacy of the adenovirus/protein vaccines against simian immunodeficiency virus in rhesus macaques. In 2018, Schuitemaker's vaccine regime was shown to induce an immune response to HIV in humans. Results of Imbokodo, an investigation into the potential for this vaccine to save the lives of thousands of young women in Sub-Saharan Africa, are expected in 2021. Another study, Mosaico, will see 3,800 individuals taking part in a Phase 3 clinical trial of the vaccine.

During the COVID-19 pandemic Janssen looked to develop a COVID-19 vaccine. Their approach started with a single viral genome, which was being tested as of March 2020. Schuitemaker estimated that it would take between 12 and 18 months to manufacture a vaccine.

Early in the COVID-19 pandemic, Schuitemaker announced Johnson & Johnson's ambition to develop a vaccine against the unknown infectious disease. Her team's approach started with the discovery of the genetic code of SARS-CoV-2, the cause of the disease COVID-19. The various vaccine candidates have been tested from March 2020. In mid-May, she announced that Janssen's most hopeful vaccine variant will be tested on humans in July 2020. In November 2020, Jansen Vaccines announced that the production of the COVID vaccine was delayed by several months due to the occurrence of an unknown disease in one test subject in phase 3. The US regulator FDA approved the Johnson & Johnson COVID-19 vaccine for use on February 27, 2021. Approval by the European Medicines Agency was given on March 11.

== Selected publications ==
- Fouchier, R A; Groenink, M; Kootstra, N A; Tersmette, M; Huisman, H G; Miedema, F; Schuitemaker, H (1992). "Phenotype-associated sequence variation in the third variable domain of the human immunodeficiency virus type 1 gp120 molecule". Journal of Virology. 66 (5): 3183–3187. doi:10.1128/jvi.66.5.3183-3187.1992. ISSN 0022-538X. PMC 241084. PMID 1560543.
- van't Wout, A B; Kootstra, N A; Mulder-Kampinga, G A; Albrecht-van Lent, N; Scherpbier, H J; Veenstra, J; Boer, K; Coutinho, R A; Miedema, F; Schuitemaker, H (1994-11-01). "Macrophage-tropic variants initiate human immunodeficiency virus type 1 infection after sexual, parenteral, and vertical transmission". Journal of Clinical Investigation. 94 (5): 2060–2067. doi:10.1172/jci117560. ISSN 0021-9738. PMC 294642. PMID 7962552.
- "Glycan recognition on HIV env by broadly neutralizing antibodies (bNAbs)". Science-Business EXchange. 7 (40): 1192. 2014. doi:10.1038/scibx.2014.1192. ISSN 1945-3477.

== Personal life ==
Schuitemaker has three sons.
