= Study of Transition, Outcomes, and Gender =

Cohort study of health

The Study of Transition, Outcomes, and Gender (STRONG) is a cohort study of health in transgender people before and during or after gender-affirming treatments such as gender-affirming hormone therapy and gender-affirming surgery. It is being conducted at Kaiser Permanente sites in Northern California, Southern California, and Georgia and includes over 6,000 transgender people. The study was underway by 2015 and the first paper for the study was published in 2017. The STRONG cohort represents the largest cohort of transgender people studied to date and the first such large-scale study conducted in the United States.

STRONG has published papers assessing transgender population size and demographics, agreement between electronic medical records and self-reported gender identity, gender dysphoria and mental health, suicidality, "passing" and mental health, progression of gender dysphoria in transgender youth, hematological parameters, liver parameters, acne risk, psoriasis risk, cardiovascular health, diabetes risk, and cancer risk.

== See also ==
- European Network for the Investigation of Gender Incongruence (ENIGI)
