= Jaap Goudsmit =

Dutch scientist (born 1951)

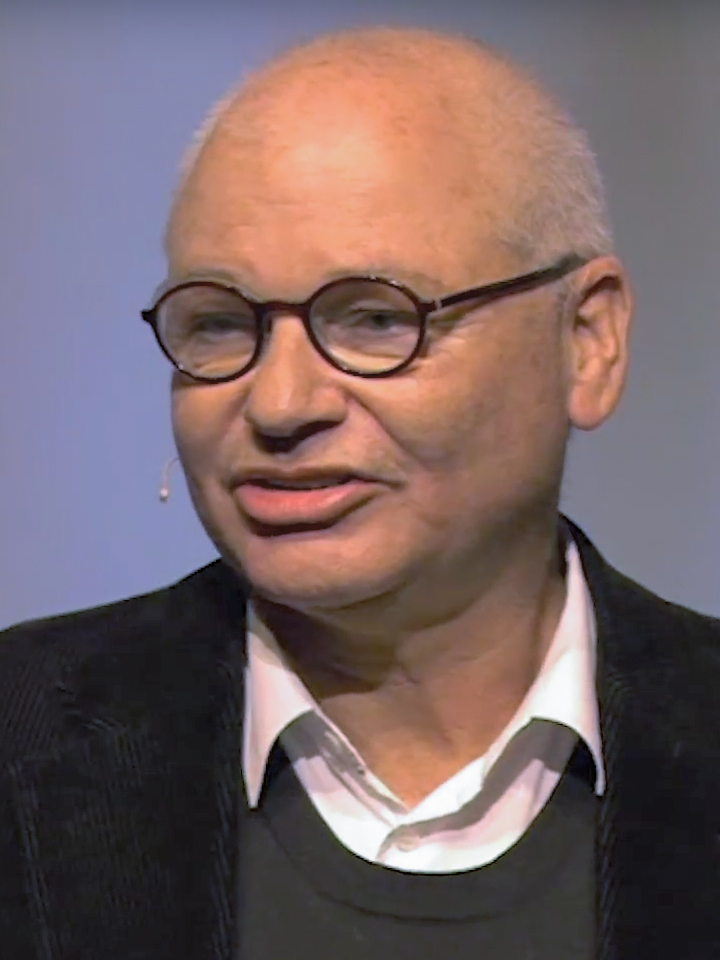
Jaap Goudsmit (2017)

Jaap Goudsmit (born July 22, 1951 in Amsterdam) is a Dutch scientist, known for his research in the field of AIDS and influenza. He shifted his research interest to aging and neurodegenerative diseases, like Alzheimer's Disease. He is also a prolific writer of non-fiction books: Viral Sex: the Nature of AIDS (1997); Viral Fitness: The Next SARS and West Nile in the Making (2004); Serendipity (2012); The Vaccine Bug: A Personal History of the World of Immunity, 1978–2011 (2013); Immorbidity: Spelling Out a Life Free of Dis-ease (2015); The Time of your Life: Staying Healthy to the End (2016) and The Art of Facing Mortality: A Scientist's View (2016).

Goudsmit was among the first in 1986 who discovered that the amount of HIV in blood predicted the progression to clinically manifest AIDS and he discovered in 2008 the Achilles heel of the influenza virus that opened the way towards a universal influenza vaccine. In 2013 Goudsmit coined the concept "Immorbidity" for a human life course immune to age-related diseases that prematurely end life, accepting that even with a minimum of disease human life ends. In 2000 the science-fiction writer Wil McCarthy introduced the term " immorbidity " in his book " The Collapsium" as the concept to eradicate all terminal illness during time transport over lightyears making the transported people virtually immortal. Goudsmit disagrees with this link between immortality and immorbidity.

In 1978 Goudsmit received his MD degree with honor at the Faculty of Medicine of the University of Amsterdam. He was awarded a Fogarty fellowship and joined the research on kuru with Nobel Prize winner Daniel Carleton Gajdusek. He received his PhD from the University of Amsterdam in 1982. He received a Fogarty Visiting Scientist Award to do postdoctoral research at the National Institutes of Health in Bethesda, Maryland. In 1983 Goudsmit became board certified in the Netherlands as a Medical Microbiologist. From 1989 -2001 he was professor in virology at the University of Amsterdam. One Science paper published in 1990 with Goudsmit as senior author created a controversy in the Netherlands and concerned a study of blocking of HIV replication by antisense DNA. Despite the fact that Goudsmit had to retract this paper, he was chosen by his peers in a 1993 Science article as one of the best European AIDS scientists and is still one of the most productive and most cited virologists worldwide.

Goudsmit was appointed professor of virology in 1989 at the Academic Medical Center of the University of Amsterdam, a position he held till 2001. He has been heading the Department of Human Retrovirology at the Academic Medical Center (AMC) of the University of Amsterdam from 1996 to 2002 and chairman of the AMC Research Institute for Infectious Diseases and the AMC Institute for Science Education. From 1984 -2001 he was one of the principal researchers of the Amsterdam Cohort Studies on HIV infection and AIDS among homosexual men and HIV drug users. From 2001 to 2016 Goudsmit was professor of vaccinology and immunoprophylaxis in the department of Internal Medicine at the Academic Medical Center of the University of Amsterdam and in 2016 he became professor of Pathogenesis and natural history of neurodegenerative diseases in the Department of Neurology, Amsterdam Neuroscience, Academic Medical Center. In 2016 Goudsmit was appointed professor of epidemiology at the Harvard T.H.Chan School of Public Health. In 2019 Goudsmit was appointed Senior Vice President and Chief Scientific Officer of the Human Vaccines Project (www.humanvaccinesproject.org)

He chaired the Scientific Advisory Committee of the International AIDS Vaccine Initiative (IAVI) and has been a member of its board. He was project leader and (co)chair of Eurovacc Foundation. In 2002 Goudsmit joined Crucell, a biotechnology company in Leiden, as Chief Medical Officer and Executive Vice President of Vaccine Research and Development. From 2004 -2011 he was Chief Scientific Officer of Crucell and member of the management board. When Crucell was acquired by Johnson and Johnson Goudsmit became head of the Crucell Vaccine Institute from 2011 to 2015, an institute focusing on influenza research. In 2015 he became global head of the Janssen Prevention Center, that focuses on the prevention of non-communicable diseases with a special emphasis on prognostic markers for age-related diseases. In 2017 Goudsmit retired from Johnson & Johnson and returned to academia to study Alzheimer's Disease and Ageing.

Goudsmit is a researcher who has authored or co-authored more than 560 scientific publications, including ten articles in Science, six in Nature, and twelve in Proceedings of the National Academy of Sciences (PNAS). According to the Institute for Scientific Information, he was included in the list of most-cited scientists in 2001. In 2016, Goudsmit received an honorary degree from Vrije Universiteit and the Vrije Universiteit Medical Center in recognition of his contributions to science in both academia and the biopharmaceutical industry.

== Sources ==
- Forbes.com
