= Gender identity clinic =

Clinic for transgender health care

A gender identity clinic is a type of specialist clinic providing services relating to transgender health care.

== List of clinics and hospitals ==
=== Asia ===
==== Hong Kong ====
- Gender Identity Clinic at the Prince of Wales Hospital in Shatin, New Territories

==== South Korea ====
- LGBTQ+ Center at Kangdong Sacred Heart Hospital in Gangdong-gu, Seoul

=== Europe ===
==== Netherlands ====
- Center of Expertise on Gender Dysphoria at the University Medical Center of the Vrije Universiteit Amsterdam in Amsterdam
  - The clinic opened in 1975 for adults only. From 1987 onwards, a practice dedicated to adolescents opened in Utrecht.^{:301} The children's clinic merged with the adult clinic in 2002, moving to Amsterdam.^{:301-302;} (Note: "The first specialized gender identity clinic for children and adolescents in the Netherlands opened its doors at the Utrecht University Medical Center in 1987. (...) In 2002, the clinic moved to the VU University Medical Center in Amsterdam and is now part of the Center of Expertise on Gender Dysphoria (Cohen-Kettenis & de Vries, 2012, pp. 301-302).")
- Radboud UMC in Nijmegen
  - The clinic opened on March 2, 2020 for adolescents. From March 1, 2021, its practice was expanded to include care for adults.
- UMCG in Groningen
  - Adult practice already established when an endocrinological clinic for adolescents opened on April 1, 2024 (diagnosis and psychological support is offered by UMCG partners).

==== United Kingdom ====
===== England =====
- NHS Gender Identity Development Service of the Tavistock and Portman NHS Foundation Trust in London (closed March 2024)
- NHS Gender Identity Service of the Leeds and York Partnerships Foundation Trust in Leeds

===== Northern Ireland =====
- Regional Gender Identity Service, Brackenburn Clinic, Belfast Health and Social Care Trust in Belfast
- Knowing Our Identity, Belfast Health and Social Care Trust in Belfast

===== Scotland =====
- Chalmers Gender Identity Clinic, NHS Lothian at Chalmers Hospital in Edinburgh
- Sandyford Gender Identity Clinic, NHS Greater Glasgow and Clyde in Glasgow
- Grampian Gender Identity Clinic, NHS Grampian at Royal Cornhill Hospital in Aberdeen
- Highlands Gender Identity Clinic, NHS Highland at Raigmore Hospital in Inverness

===== Wales =====
- Welsh Gender Service, St David's Hospital in Cardiff

==== Belgium ====
Since 2007, the University Hospital of Ghent has had a specialized department, the Center for Sexology and Gender Problems, that focuses on the care needs of adolescents and administers puberty blockers in accordance with international guidelines. Because the gender clinic at the University Hospital of Ghent was difficult to access for Walloon and Brussels care recipients due to insufficient capacity, the distance and the language barrier, the need was felt to open a gender clinic for transgender minors in Wallonia as well. CHU Liège opened this on 1 October 2019.

==== Finland ====
If an adolescent experiences gender dysphoria, they are treated at one of the university hospitals. A decision on whether puberty blockers should be administered to the adolescent after a diagnosis is made on an individual basis. If so, the adolescent is treated at Tampere University Hospital or Helsinki University Hospital.

=== North America ===
==== Canada ====
- Gender Identity Clinic at the Centre for Addiction and Mental Health in Toronto
- Gender Identity Clinic at the Grey Nuns Community Hospital in Edmonton, Alberta

==== United States ====
- Center of Excellence for Transgender Health of the University of California, San Francisco in San Francisco
- Johns Hopkins Gender Identity Clinic at Johns Hopkins Hospital in Baltimore, Maryland
  - The original clinic at Johns Hopkins was open from 1966 until its closure in 1979. In 2017, it was reopened as the Center for Transgender and Gender Expansive Health.
- Gender Management Service (GeMS) of Boston Children's Hospital in Boston
- Transgender Health Program of Massachusetts General Hospital in Boston
- GenderCare Center at the Boston Medical Center in Boston
- Center for Transgender Medicine and Surgery of Mount Sinai in New York City

== See also ==
- Healthcare and the LGBT community
- Transgender health care
- Gender transitioning
