= Louis Gooren =

Dutch endocrinologist (1943–2023)

Louis J. G. Gooren (14 December 1943 – 17 September 2023) was a Dutch endocrinologist known for his work with transsexual and transgender people. He treated over 2,200 transsexual people and was one of the first physicians to treat transgender youth.

== Life and career ==
Louis J. G. Gooren was born in Wanssum on 14 December 1943. He earned his medical degree from the Catholic University of Nijmegen in 1970, then specialized in internal medicine and endocrinology at the Vrije Universiteit in Amsterdam. He founded the gender clinic (now known as the Center of Expertise on Gender Dysphoria) there in 1975, and he graduated in 1976. Gooren then studied with John Money at Johns Hopkins University in Baltimore. He earned his board certification in internal medicine and endocrinology in 1977 and completed his Ph.D. on testicular hormones in 1981.

In 1988 he became Professor of Endocrinology and held the special position Professor of Transsexuality at the Vrije Universiteit. He was featured in the 2005 documentary, Middle Sexes: Redefining He and She.

Gooren was a professor emeritus at Vrije Universiteit from 2008, and he worked as a consultant in Chiang Mai, Thailand. His work also covers gender identity and human sexual differentiation.

Gooren also published research on male menopause. He held an honorary professorship in male health at Hang Tuah University in Surabaya, Indonesia.

Louis Gooren died on 17 September 2023, at the age of 79.
