= M.A. Mendes de Leon =

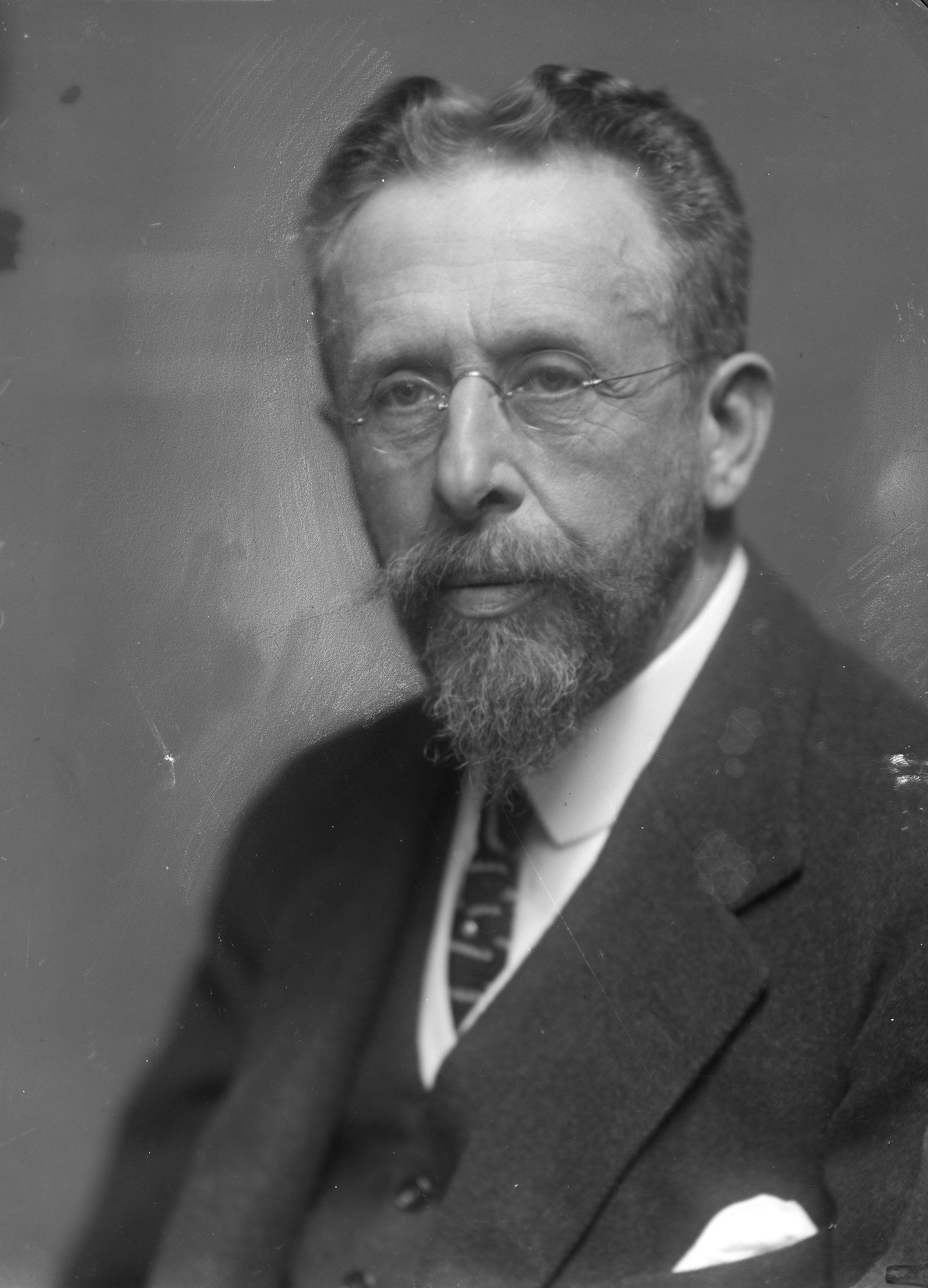
- M.A. Mendes de Leon
- Born: 5 July 1856; Bruges
- Died: 16 December 1924 (aged 68); Amsterdam
- Known for: Gynaecology
- Scientific career
- Fields: medicine
- Workplaces: University of Amsterdam

Maurice Arthur Mendes de Leon (4 July 1856, Bruges - 16 December 1924, Amsterdam) was a Dutch physician, considered one of the founding fathers of gynaecology in the Netherlands, partly because of his surgical skills, but also due to his study into the interaction between gynaecological and psychological problems.

Mendes de Leon was the son of Isaac Mendes de Leon (1808–1856) and Annely F. Phillips and grandson of Amsterdam city council member Jacobo Abraham Mendes de Leon (1784-1842) whose father, Abraham Jacob Mendes de Leon (1764-1818), was also an Amsterdam city council member. He grew up in his mothers country, England, until the age of ten, after which the family moved to Amsterdam. He studied medicines at the University of Amsterdam and in 1881 obtained a PhD at the University of Heidelberg. In 1882 he married his distant relative Anna Mathilde Teixeira de Mattos (1862–1937).

He promoted gynaecology in the Netherlands as a separate speciality, partly because of the new surgical possibilities following the discoveries of anaesthesia and antisepsis and in 1889 he started a private gynaecological clinic at the Sarphatistraat in Amsterdam. In his clinic he devoted himself to the surgery of ovarian tumours, uterus myomatosus and genital prolapse, but also to the diagnosis and treatment of supposed inflammations of the cervix and endometrium as cause of psychological disorders. In this he followed the opinions of contemporary English gynaecologists. As he was not aware of physiological histology, he nearly always found signs of inflammation. He treated this with curettage and drastic caustics, sometimes after using a dilation knife (hysterotome) for the cervix. At the turn of the twentieth century Dutch gynaecologists such as Treub and Nijhoff began to cast doubt on such theories of "reflex neurosis", but Mendes de Leon persisted in his views.
