= Arjen Dondorp =

- Born: Adrianus Mattheus Dondorp; September 1963 (age 62–63); Utrecht, Netherlands
- Education: University of Amsterdam
- Occupation: Intensivist
- Known for: Pathophysiology and treatment of severe malaria, antimalarial drug resistance and development of intensive care practice

Adrianus Mattheus Dondorp (born September 1963) is a Dutch intensivist, infectious diseases physician, and head of the Mahidol Oxford Tropical Medicine Research Unit in Bangkok. He is best known for his research in severe falciparum malaria, a disease that requires intensive care in hospital. He chairs the World Health Organization Technical Expert Group on antimalarial medication drug resistance and containment.

== Early life and education ==
Born in Utrecht, The Netherlands, Dondorp studied medicine at the University of Amsterdam between 1982 and 1986, achieving a 'doctoral' in medicine, 'with distinction'.

He became interested in blood flow properties (rheology) whilst he was a medical student and had found that 'red cell deformability' was extraordinarily reduced in falciparum malaria in returning Dutch travellers, an observation which was to steer him towards studies in the pathophysiologygy of malaria.

By 1999, he was registered as physician in infectious diseases, when he also completed a PhD in the pathophysiology of severe falciparum malaria, with special reference to ‘red cell deformability’. This research included clinical analyses completed in Thailand (1995-1996) and Kenya (1997-1998).

A year later he was registered as intensive care physician at Department of Intensive Care Medicine, Academic Medical Centre, Amsterdam, the Netherlands. Since 2001, Dondorp has continued his research as Deputy Director and Head of Malaria Research, Mahidol-Oxford Research Unit (MORU), Bangkok, Thailand.

== Background and research ==
Dondorp's foremost research interests have focused attention on the pathophysiology and treatment of severe malaria, antimalarial drug resistance and development of intensive care practice in low income countries.

"The main reason you become so ill from severe malaria is that the red blood cells harbouring the parasite become very sticky and adhere to the walls of the smallest blood vessels in all the vital organs, such as the brain, kidney and lung vasculature. This blocks normal circulation and can be fatal." - Dondorp

Findings from his clinical studies of the small blood vessels (microcirculation) in patients with severe malaria have revealed that red cells become rigid and lose ability to change shape. They lose their flexibility to pass through blood vessels that are smaller in diameter than the red cells. This rigidity impairs blood flow through the small blood vessels. Dondorp's team demonstrated this impairment of microcirculatory flow due to red cell rigidity in severe malaria.

A strong prognostic significance was also found to be the amount of plasma PfHRP2, a protein released by the sequestrated parasite. This protein contributes to the metabolic acidosis seen in people with severe malaria. His team, however, demonstrated resistance of Plasmodium falciparum to artemisinins in Western Cambodia. New treatments would have to be found to contain efforts against this serious threat to global malaria control.

He has highlighted that resistance to artemisinin and piperaquine is a genuine worry, and should malaria become untreatable, would be a significant threat to controlling the spread of malaria from South East Asia to Africa, which is therefore a "race against time".

Dondorp was elected a Fellow of the Academy of Medical Sciences in 2021.

== The World Health Organization ==
Artesunate is recommended by the World Health Organization (WHO) in preference to quinidine for the treatment of severe malaria and has been used worldwide for many years. Artesunate is in the class of medications known as artemisinins, which are derivatives from sweet wormwood (Artemisia annua).

Dondorp chairs the WHO Technical Expert Group on Antimalarial Drug Resistance. The group provides advice to the World Health Organization and supports the design and implementation of programmes related to the containment of artemisinin resistance.
