= VU University Medical Center =

VU University Medical Center Amsterdam
- Stichting VU-VUmc
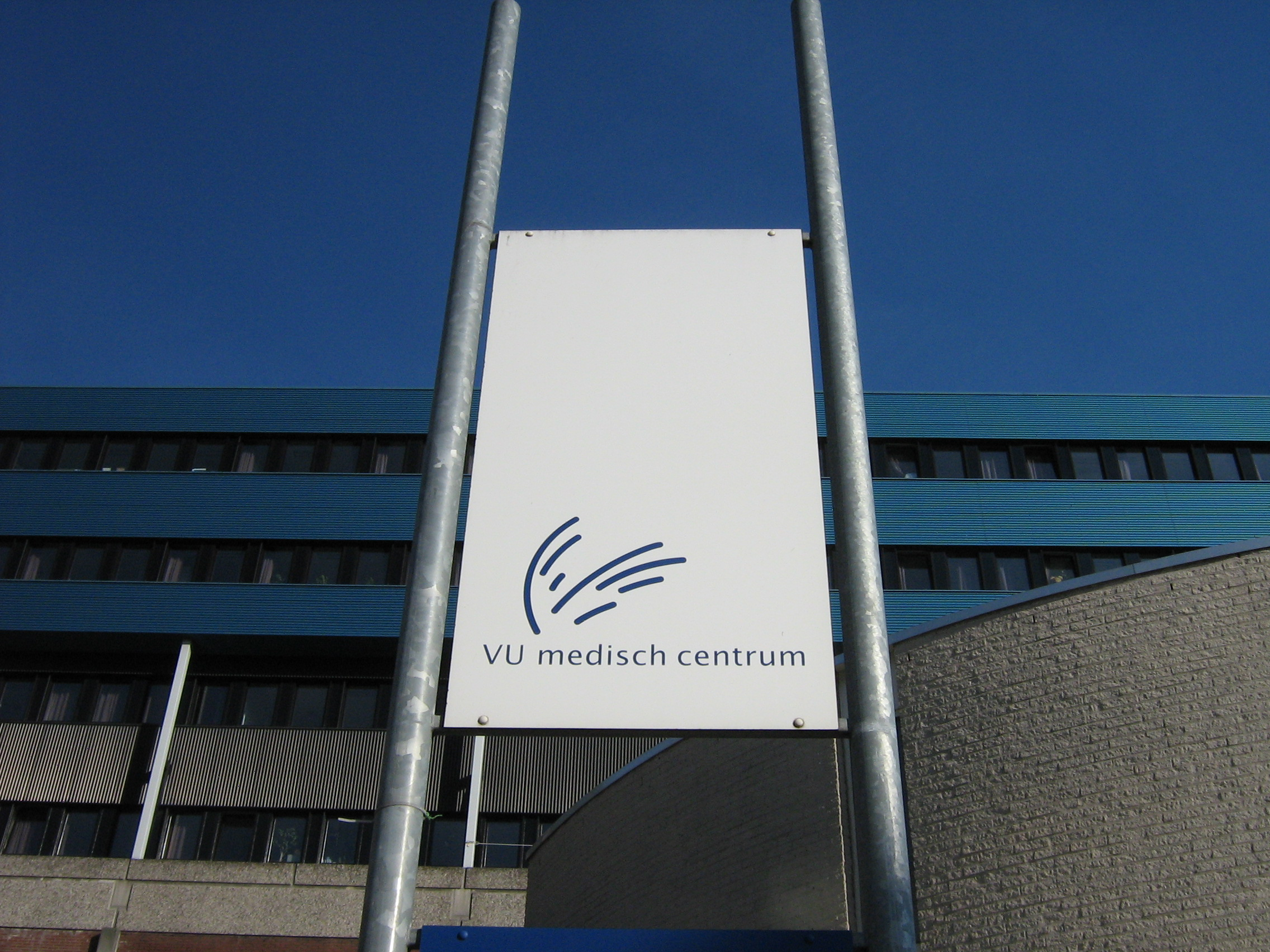

- Location in the Netherlands

Geography
- Location: De Boelelaan 1117, 1081 HV Amsterdam, Netherlands
- Coordinates: 52°20′04″N 4°51′36″E

Organisation
- Type: Teaching
- Affiliated university: Vrije Universiteit Amsterdam

Services
- Emergency department: No
- Beds: 733

Helipads
- Helipad: Yes

History
- Founded: 1964 (as the Academic Hospital of the Vrije Universiteit)

Links
- Website: www.vumc.com
- Lists: Hospitals in Netherlands

VU University Medical Center Amsterdam (Dutch: VU Medisch Centrum or VUmc) is the university hospital affiliated with the Vrije Universiteit Amsterdam. It is rated one of the best academic medical centers in the country in terms of patient care and research. It is located next to Amsterdam's A10 ringway in the southwestern part of the city, next to the campus of the Vrije Universiteit and close to Schiphol airport.

On 30 October 2015, researchers at the VUmc Cancer Center Amsterdam reported developing a blood test that, from a single drop of blood, can diagnose cancer with a probability of 97%, and about 6-8% probability of a false diagnosis, in healthy patients. In October 2015 the VUmc got the first MRIdian system in Europe, currently the most advanced radiation therapy system to treat tumors, because the system has a built-in MRI scanner to aim the radiation optimally.

== History ==
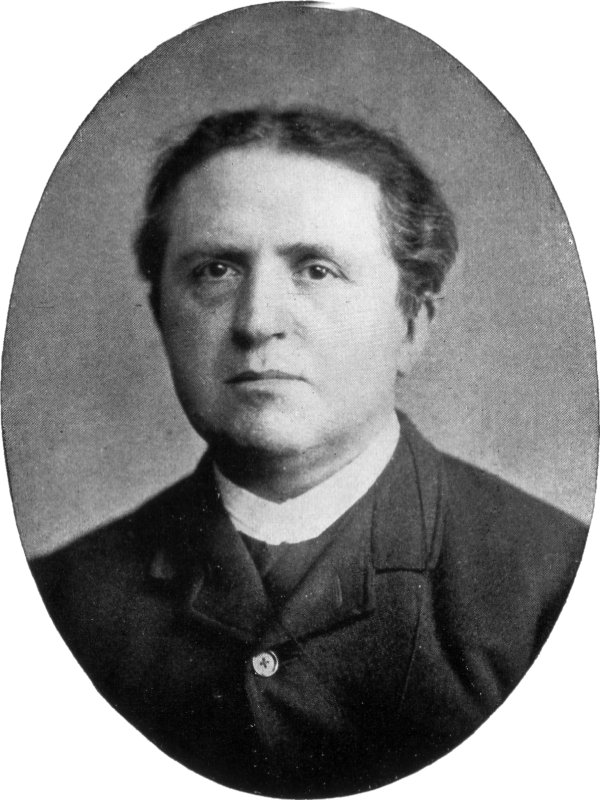
Abraham Kuyper (1899)

VU University Medical Center Amsterdam was opened in 1964 as the Academic Hospital of the Vrije Universiteit Amsterdam (VU). This was made possible by the Vrouwen VU-hulp ('Women VU Assistance') charity, which was started in 1932 and aimed to support the Vrije Universiteit. Money was collected in the now iconic green tins with the likeness of Abraham Kuyper. These tins were distributed to families of the Reformed Churches in the Netherlands, specifically to the housewives of those families. After the end of the Second World War the charity's goal became to raise money to start a medical school. It took about seven years before sufficient funds were raised, with the government footing 85 percent of the bill. Because of this, the idea that VUmc was funded by the kleine luyden ('little people') still exists today.

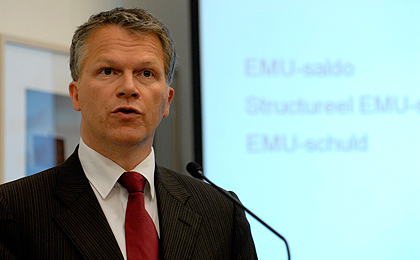
Wouter Bos (2008)

VU University Medical Center Amsterdam was created in 2001 by the merger of the Academic Hospital of VU with the medical school of VU, nowadays called VUmc School of Medical Sciences. In June 2013 Wouter Bos was appointed as chairman of the board of directors of VU University Medical Center.

== Cooperation and merger ==
VU University Medical Center Amsterdam is in the process of merging with the other university hospital of Amsterdam, the Academic Medical Center (AMC), which is affiliated with the Universiteit van Amsterdam, Amsterdam's other university. Together, in 2018, they merged to form Amsterdam University Medical Centers.

== Care ==
Tertiary care departments include pediatric and neonatal intensive care, cardiothoracic surgery, neurosurgery, infectious diseases and other departments. VUmc had the largest Level I trauma center in the country and an air medical services helicopter was affiliated with the hospital, covering three provinces. The trauma center was closed in 2024.

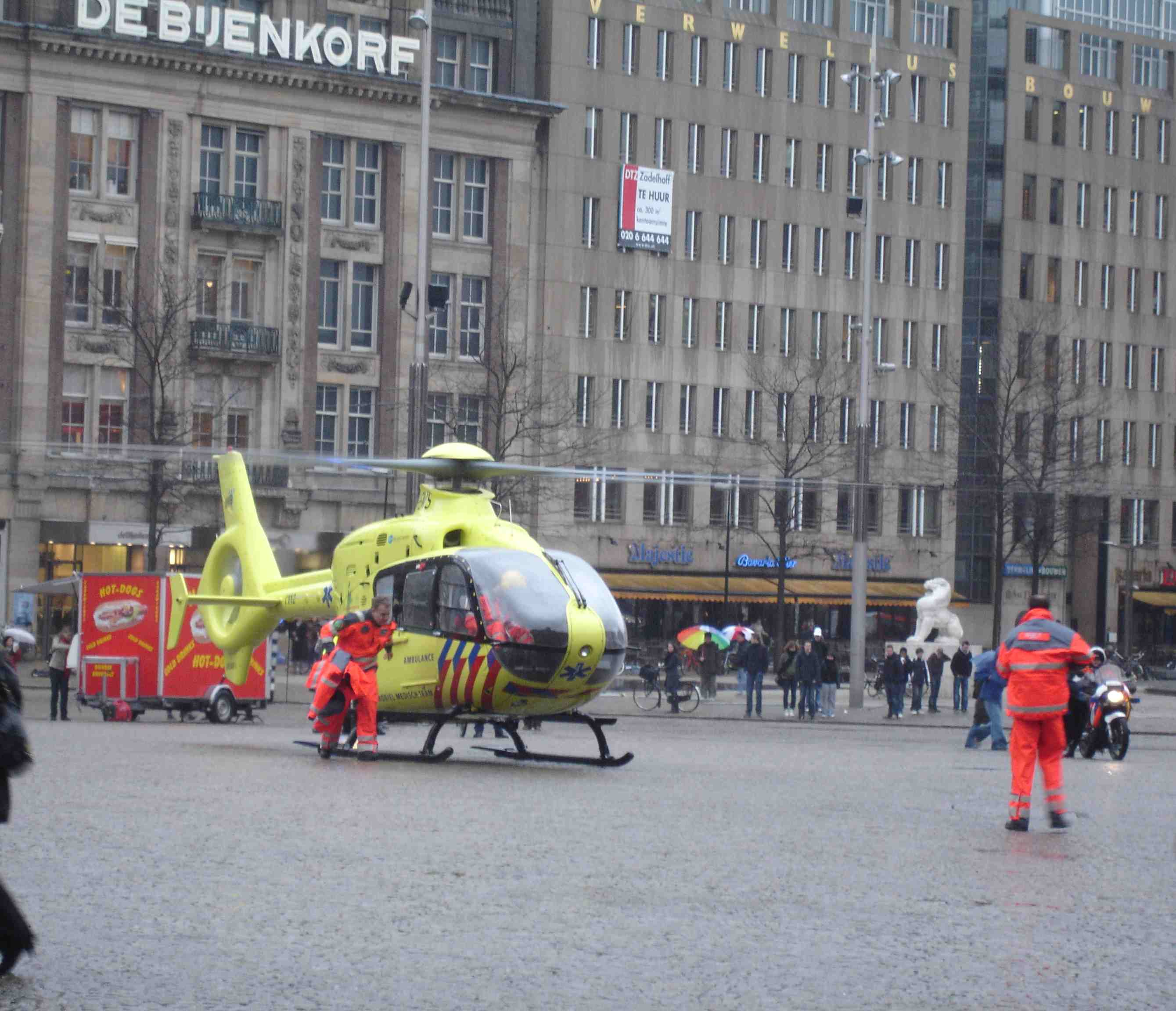
Air medical services affiliated with VUmc

Special units include:

- Neurosurgery
- Cardiothoracic surgery
- Neonatal and pediatric surgery and intensive care
- Pediatric oncology
- Sex reassignment surgery

In June 2026, the organisation announced that all care will transfer from VUmc to AMC. Only research, education and training will stay at the VUmc location. This transition must be completed in 2040.

== Research and education ==
The VUmc has one of the highest publications in the Netherlands and has a well known reputation worldwide for class leading research. VUmc has several special research units, some of which are:

- VUmc Cancer Center Amsterdam (CCA)
- Neuroscience Campus Amsterdam (NCA)
- EMGO Research Institute
- Institute for Cardiovascular Research (ICaR-VU)

The VUmc also focuses on education and has different departments for their students. These are:

- VUmc School of Medical Sciences (Faculty of Medicine)
- VUmc Academy (coaching for medical students and based on e-learning)
- VUmc Amstel Academy (department for educating Nurses)

The Center of Expertise on Gender Dysphoria (CEGD; or Kennis- en Zorgcentrum Genderdysforie, KZcG), a transgender clinic, is located at the VUmc.

== Reputation ==
The medical center installed 35 high-grade security cameras and 35 microphones in the emergency department of the hospital for 16 days in January and February 2012 to film the TV program 24 uur: tussen leven en dood (based on the British program 24 Hours in A&E.) After broadcasting the first episode the show was cancelled at the request of the VUmc.

Initially, three patients brought charges against the hospital and the production company for breaking doctor-patient confidentiality, illegal wiretapping and breach of Dutch privacy laws. The charges were settled, and VUmc agreed to pay €30,000.
