= Academic Medical Center (Amsterdam) =

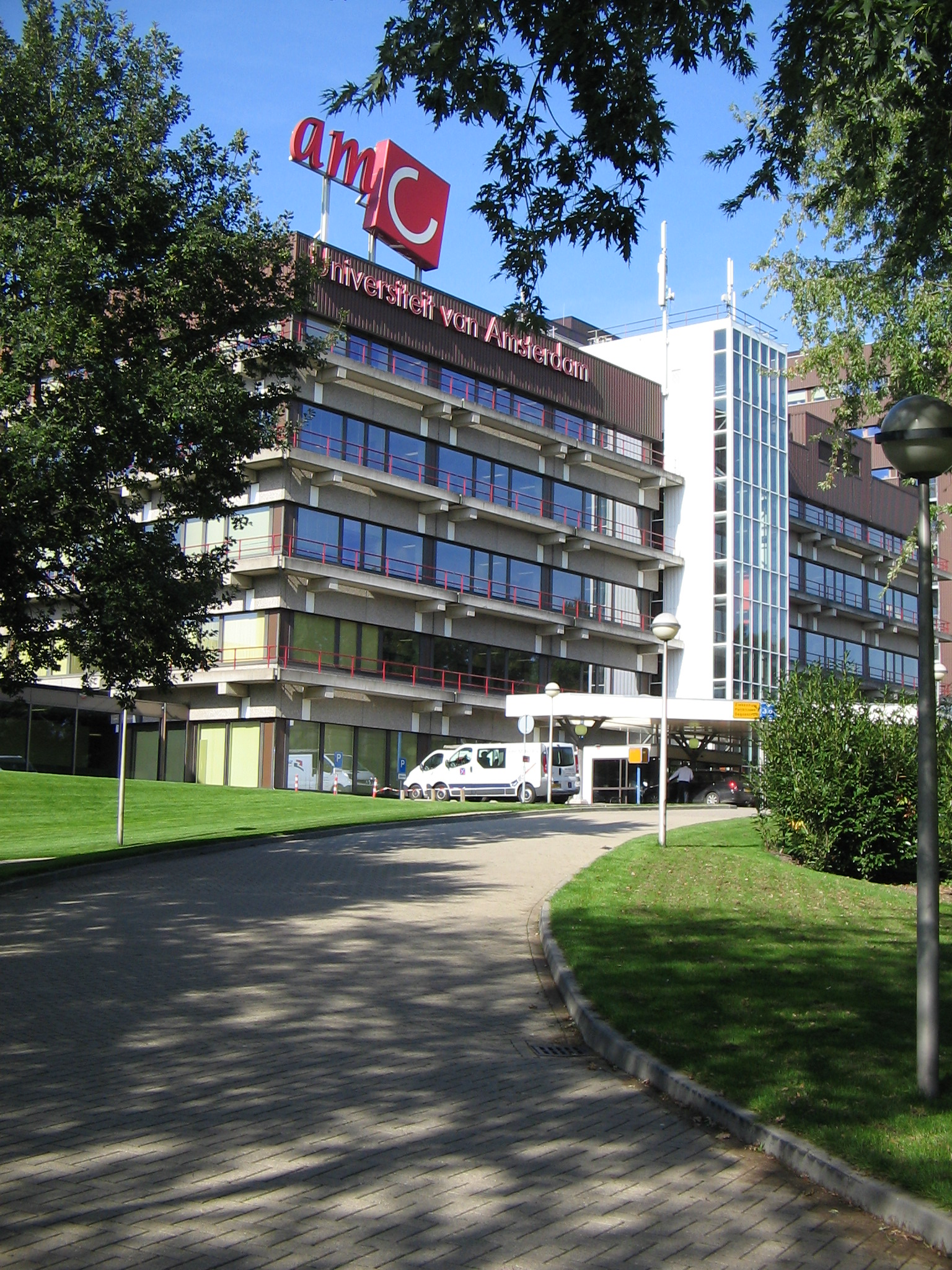
- Academisch Medisch Centrum Amsterdam

Geography
- Location: Bijlmer, Amsterdam, Netherlands
- Coordinates: 52°17′40″N 4°57′27″E

Organisation
- Type: Teaching
- Affiliated university: University of Amsterdam

Services
- Emergency department: Level I trauma center
- Beds: 1002 (2011)

History
- Founded: 1983

Links
- Website: www.amc.nl (in Dutch)
- Lists: Hospitals in Netherlands

The Academic Medical Center (Dutch: Academisch Medisch Centrum), or AMC, was the university hospital affiliated with the University of Amsterdam. After merging with the VU University Medical Center, it now operates as the Amsterdam University Medical Center, a single organization with two locations, affiliated with two universities. It was one of the largest and leading hospitals of the Netherlands, located in the Bijlmer neighborhood in the most south-eastern part of the city of Amsterdam.

== History ==
The Academic Medical Center was founded in the year 1983, it stands as one of the Netherlands' most extensive and technologically advanced hospitals, boasting a global medical ranking of approximately the fiftieth position.

== Services ==
The AMC has had an intensive cooperation with the other university hospital of Amsterdam, the VU University Medical Center (VUmc), affiliated with the Vrije Universiteit Amsterdam. The two hospitals merged their administrative tasks on 7 June 2018 to form the Amsterdam University Medical Center. The merger was fully completed on 31 December 2023.

Tertiary care departments included advanced trauma care, pediatric and neonatal intensive care, cardiothoracic surgery, neurosurgery, infectious diseases and other departments.

Special units include:

- Neurosurgery
- Cardiothoracic surgery
- Neonatal and pediatric surgery and intensive care
- Pediatric oncology
- Level I trauma center

== Gallery ==
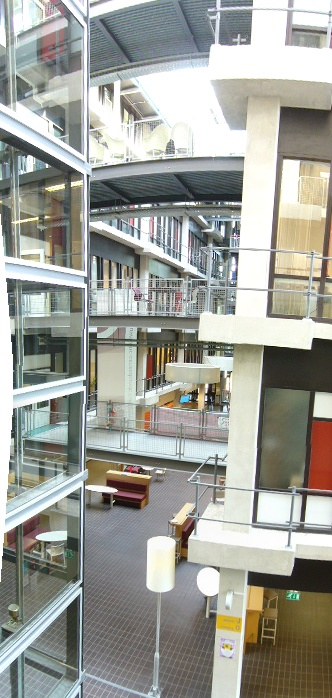
Interior

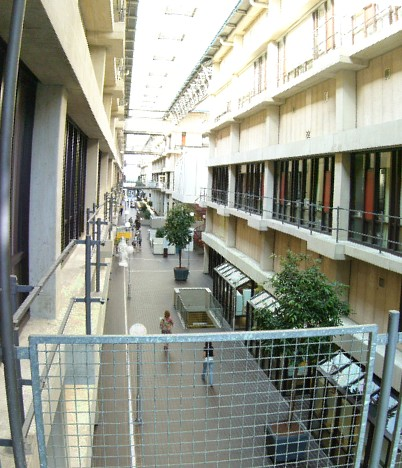
Interior

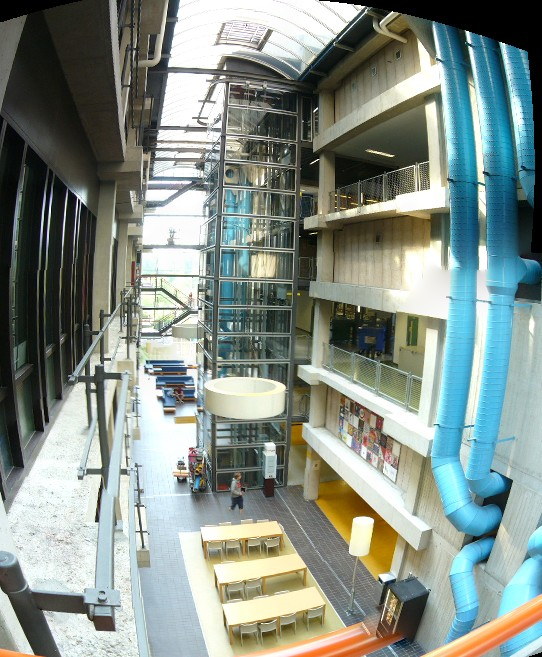
Interior

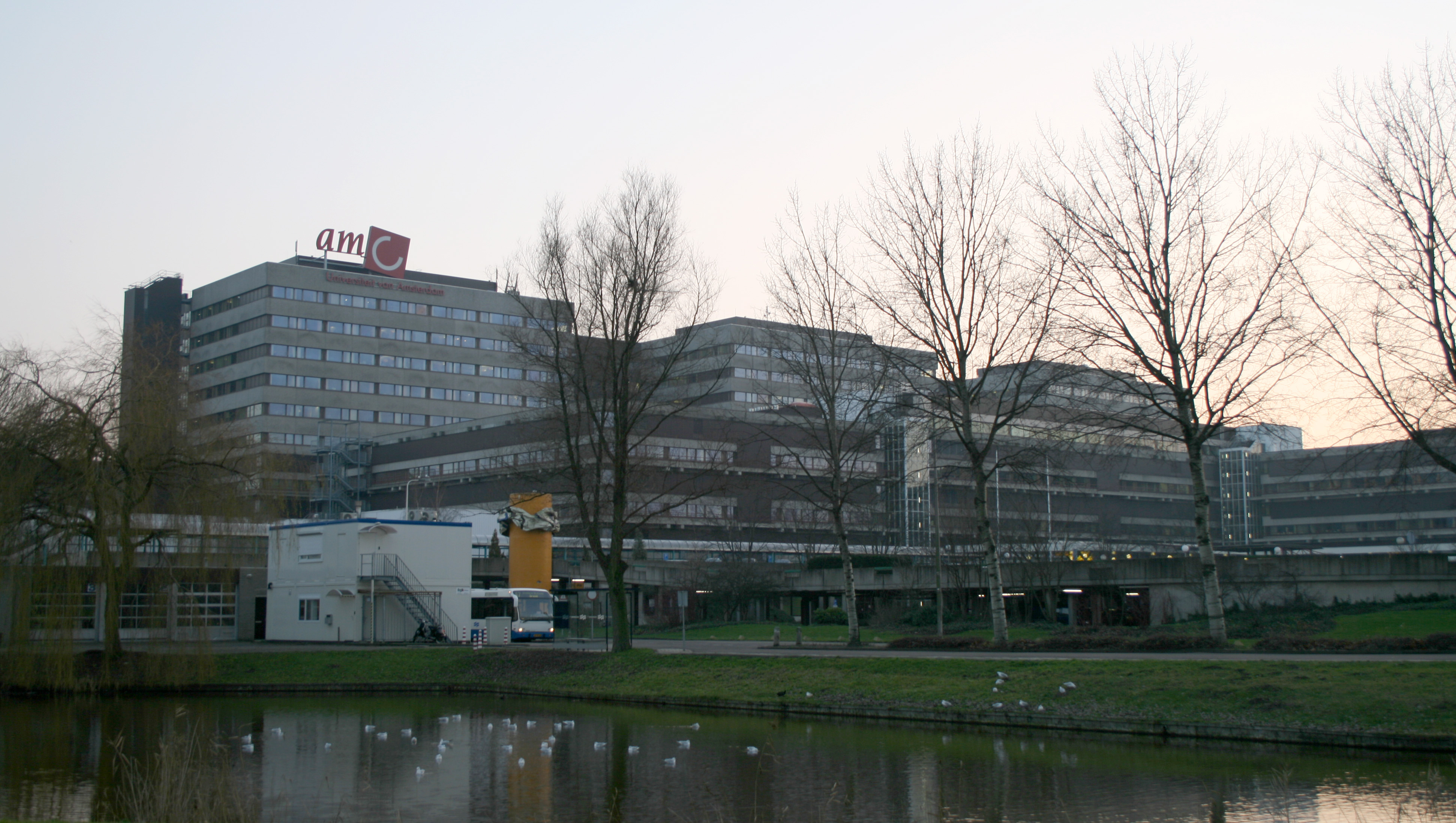
The AMC campus
