= De Boer =

De Boer is a Dutch occupational surname meaning "the farmer". Variant spellings include den Boer and DeBoer. Notable people with this surname include:

== De Boer / DeBoer ==
=== A ===
- Ad de Boer (born 1946), Dutch politician and journalist
- Alan DeBoer (born 1950/51), American businessman and Oregon politician
- Ale de Boer (born 1987), Dutch footballer
- Alice de Boer (1872–1955), medical doctor in Sri Lanka
- Arthur DeBoer (1917–2007), American cardiologist

=== B ===
- Betty de Boer (born 1971), Dutch politician
- Brent DeBoer, American singer-songwriter of The Dandy Warhols

=== C ===
- Cherie de Boer (born 1951), Dutch accordionist
- Christine de Boer (born 1983), Dutch comedy musician and cabaret performer

=== E ===
- Erik-Jan de Boer (born 1967), Dutch animation director

=== F ===
- Frank de Boer (born 1970), Dutch football defender and manager, twin brother of Ronald
- Fredrik deBoer, American academic

=== H ===
- Hannes de Boer (1899–1982), Dutch long jumper
- Hans de Boer (born 1937), Dutch politician and State Secretary
- Harry DeBoer (1903–1992), American labor activist
- Henry Speldewinde de Boer (1896–1957), Ceylonese British-colonial doctor
- Herman Pieter de Boer (1928–2014), Dutch writer, journalist and lyricist

=== J ===
- Jan de Boer (gymnast) (1859–1941), Dutch gymnast
- Jan de Boer (footballer, born 1898) (1898–1988), Dutch football goalkeeper
- Jan de Boer (physicist) (born 1967), Dutch physicist
- Jan Hendrik de Boer (1899–1971), Dutch physicist and chemist
- Jelle Taeke de Boer (1908–1970), Dutch art collector
- Johanna de Boer (1901–1984), Dutch fencer

=== K ===
- Kalen DeBoer (born 1974), American football coach and player
- Kito de Boer (born 1957), Dutch businessman and art collector
- Klaas de Boer (born 1942), Dutch-born U.S. soccer player and coach

=== L ===
- Leo de Boer (born 1953), Dutch film director
- Lieuwe de Boer (born 1951), Dutch speed skater
- Linda de Boer (born 1954), Dutch swimmer

=== M ===
- Manon de Boer (born 1966), Dutch video artist
- Margreeth de Boer (born 1939), Dutch politician
- Marloes de Boer (born 1982), Dutch football defender
- Matt de Boer (born 1990), Australian rules footballer
- Maud de Boer-Buquicchio (born 1944), Dutch jurist
- Mickey de Boer, Dutch international cricketer
- Mieke de Boer (born 1980), Dutch darts player

=== N ===
- Nancy De Boer, American politician
- Nicole de Boer (born 1970), Canadian actress

=== P ===
- Peter DeBoer (born 1968), Canadian hockey player and coach
- Peter de Boer (born 1971), Scotland-born New Zealand curler
- Piet de Boer (1919–1984), Dutch football forward

=== R ===
- Remmelt de Boer (born 1942), Dutch educator and politician
- René de Boer (born 1945), Dutch sculptor
- Rody de Boer (born 1997), Dutch football goalkeeper
- Roelf de Boer (born 1949), Dutch politician
- Ronald de Boer (born 1970), Dutch football midfielder, twin brother of Frank<
- Ronald DeBoer (born 1965), Canadian writer and Superintendent at Waterloo Region District Schoolboard
- Rudolf de Boer (1444–1485), Dutch humanist better known as Agricola

=== S ===
- Saco Rienk de Boer (1883–1974), Dutch architect
- Sophie de Boer (born 1990), Dutch racing cyclist

=== T ===
- Ted de Boer (born 1943), Dutch law scholar
- Teuntje de Boer (born 1968), Dutch cricketer
- Tobias de Boer (1930–2016), Dutch mechanical engineer

=== W ===
- Wendy DeBoer (born 1974), American Nebraska politician
- Wubbo de Boer (1948–2017), Dutch civil servant

=== Y ===
- Yoann de Boer (born 1982), Dutch football midfielder
- Yvo de Boer (born 1954), Dutch diplomat and environmentalist

== Den Boer ==
- Aart den Boer (1852–1941), Dutch architect and contractor
- Godfried van den Boer (1934–2012), Belgian footballer
- Jan den Boer (1889–1944), Dutch water polo player
- Nick DenBoer (born 1979), Canadian director
- Ruben Den Boer (born 1992), Dutch DJ and music producer

== See also ==
- De Boor (disambiguation)
- Boer (surname)
