= Boer (disambiguation) =

Boer or Boers or variation, may refer to:

== People ==
- Boers, Dutch settlers of South Africa, who became the Afrikaaners
- Boer (surname), a Dutch surname meaning "Farmer"; including "Boers", "Boeres", and variations
- Boer Chen (Chinese: 陈波儿; pinyin: Chén Bō'ér; 1907–1951), Chinese actress

== Places ==
- Boer, Waadhoeke, Friesland, Netherlands; a village

== Other uses ==
- Boer War (disambiguation)
- Boer goat, a type of goat
- Boer pony, a type of pony
- Indios del Bóer, a Nicaraguan professional baseball team

== See also ==
- De Boer (surname)
- Dayi Pier-2 light rail station
- Penglai Pier-2 light rail station
