= Cornelis Hendrik Edelman =

Dutch geologist and soil scientist

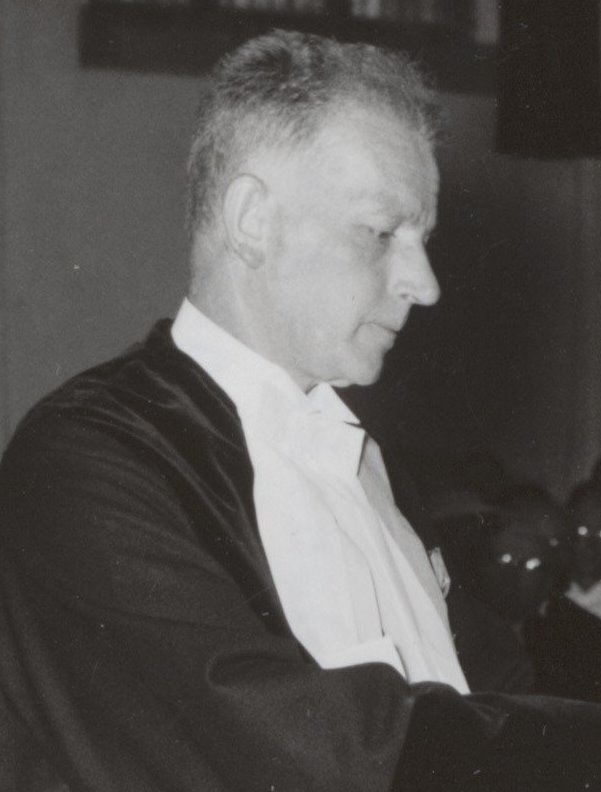
Edelman in 1956

Cornelis Hendrik "Kees" Edelman (29 January 1903 – 15 May 1964) was a Dutch geologist and soil scientist who worked at the Agricultural College in Wageningen. He is credited with popularizing the use of the so-called Edelman soil auger to study soil profiles. Using studies of soil profiles he compiled a very high resolution soil-types map of the Netherlands.

Edelman was born in Rotterdam to teacher Hendrik Cornelis and Maria Catharina van Schoonneveldt. After schooling in Rotterdam he obtained a diploma in mine engineering from Delft and worked on petroleum geology briefly. He then joined as a curator at the Geological Institute of the University of Amsterdam. He examined the diffusion of heavy minerals and worked on sediment petrology for which he received a doctorate in 1933. He then became a professor of mineralogy, petrology, geology, and agroecology at the Wageningen Agricultural College where he succeeded Johan van Baren. He worked across the Netherlands with Willem A. J. Oosting until the latter's death in 1942. During the war years, while surveying in the Bommelerwaard district with students the German-made Jasmin patent soil drill that they used broke and the Lathum village smith Jan Eijkelkamp helped make a more effective substitute for them which now goes by the name of the Edelman auger. It has a diameter of about 7 cm and the handle was originally about 1.2 m, supposedly because it fit perfectly in the boot of a Volkswagen Beetle. Edelman was known for his organizational efficiency and in 1946 he was made Rector Magnificus of the Agricultural College. He organized the 4th International Soil Science Congress in Amsterdam and influenced a whole generation of soil scientists. His soil map of the Netherlands published in 1950 is considered a landmark in soil science.

== Personal life ==
In 1953, he married social geographer Alida Vlam who became Alida Edelman-Vlam. Together, they conducted landscape research in Wageningen through a combination of the disciplines of soil science, historical geography, history and toponymy.
