= De Boor =

De Boor is a surname. Notable people with the surname include:

- Carl R. de Boor (born 1937), American mathematician
  - De Boor's algorithm, in numerical analysis
- Carl de Boor (Byzantinist) (1848–1923), German scholar of Byzantine studies
- Helmut de Boor (1891–1976), German scholar of Germanic studies

== See also ==
- De Boer (disambiguation)
- Boor (disambiguation)
