= Johan van Baren =

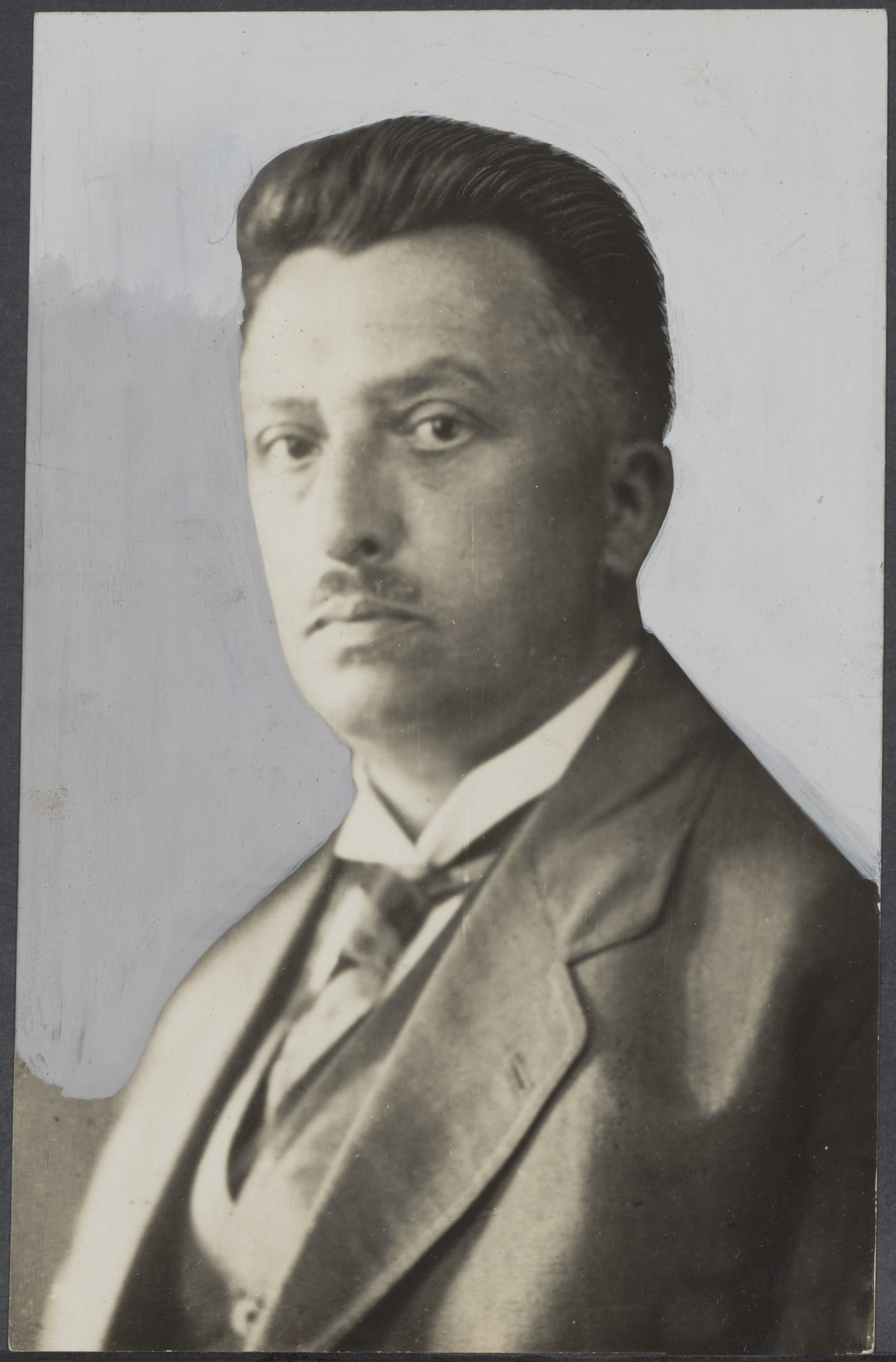
Professor van Baren in 1924

Johan van Baren (18 April 1875 – 7 February 1933) was a Dutch agricultural scientist who specialized in soil science. His most influential work was on the soils of the Netherlands De bodem van Nederland (in two volumes 1907, 1927). His son Ferdinand Alexander van Baren (1905-1975) also became a soil scientist.

Van Baren was born in Rotterdam. He was an assistant to J. L. C. Schroeder van der Kolk (1865-1905) from 1899 at the University of Delft. From 1903 he taught mineralogy at the Wageningen Agricultural College and became a professor of mineralogy, geology, and agrogeology when it was made into a university in 1918. He wrote a biography of W.C.H. Staring (1808-1877). He was a founding member of the Geological Society of the Netherlands and Colonies. In 1931 he wrote on the development of soil on the volcanic island of Krakatoa. Over twenty years he worked on a two volume textbook on the soils of the Netherlands. He married Jeanne Pauline van de Meijer in 1902 and they had three sons including Ferdinand Alexander van Baren who studied soil science under Cornelis Hendrik Edelman and became a specialist on tropical soils.
