= Boor =

Boor may refer to:

== Arts and entertainment ==
- The Bear (play), or The Boor, an 1888 play by Anton Chekhov
- The Boor, a 1968 opera by Ulysses Kay based on Chekhov's play
- The Boor, a 1957 opera, first performed in 2017, by Dominick Argento
- The Boors, an 18th-century comedy play by Carlo Goldoni

== People ==
- Zoltán Böőr (born 1978), Hungarian footballer
- Boris Boor (born 1950), Austrian equestrian
- Brandon Boor (born 1988), Australian rugby league footballer
- John Boor (died c. 1402) English clergyman
- Kathryn Boor (fl. from 1994), American food scientist and academic administrator
- Martin Boor, pseudonym of Margaret Carroux (1912–1991), German translator

== Other uses ==
- Balanda Boor people, or Boor, an ethnic group in South Sudan
- Boor language, spoken in Chad

== See also ==
- Bore (disambiguation)
- Boers, Dutch colonists in South Africa
- de Boor, a surname
- Peasant, "Bur" in Low German
