= Alida Edelman-Vlam =

Dutch social geographer

Alida (Alie) Wilhelmina Vlam, later known as Edelman-Vlam (Hoorn, 6 July 1909 – Wageningen, 17 February 1999), was a Dutch social geographer. She was one of the founders of the historical-geographical tradition in Wageningen.

== Life and work ==
Vlam was the daughter of an accountant Martinus Vlam and Netta Maria Roos. She had a younger brother named Christiaan. She studied human geography at the University of Amsterdam and passed her exams on 3 October 1930. She obtained her PhD in 1942 with the Utrecht professor of physical geography Karl Oestreich. Her dissertation titled historical-morphological research of some Zeeland islands, where she discussed historical-geographical issues related to geology, geomorphology and soil science. Her research was supervised by the engineer Johan van Veen.

In 1946 she joined the staff of geographer Kees Edelman, who had recently founded the Foundation for Soil Mapping in Bennekom. Her specialty initially concerned the collection of old maps and making historical-geographical literature available to mappers. In 1953, shortly after Edelman's divorce was finalized, she married him.

Together with Kees Edelman, she further expanded interdisciplinary landscape research in Wageningen through a combination of the disciplines of soil science, historical geography, history and toponymy. She worked with Max van Hoffen, among others, and during her time in Wageningen she mainly focused on Dutch sandy soils.

She also researched the historical geography of Bennekom and joined the management of the Old-Bennekom Association, but with her husband's illness in 1962, she resigned from the board. At that time, the association made her an honorary member, "partly because of her contribution to the memorial book Een Veluws village (ca. 1959), which made Bennekom one of the best-researched villages in the Netherlands in historical geography." In addition, Edelman-Vlam remained a member of the West Frisian Society for the rest of her life.

She published papers in the professional journal Boor en Spade (Drill and Spade) series, among others. She retired in 1974.

Edelman-Vlam spent her final days in a Bennekom private care home, where she died on 17 February 1999.

== Legacy ==
An archived collection of Edelman-Vlam's letters, notes and papers resides at Meertens Institute in Amsterdam.
