= Boer (surname) =

Boer is a Dutch occupational surname meaning "farmer". Variants are Boere, Boeres, Boers, Den Boer and most commonly De Boer. People with this surname include:

Boer

- Albert Boer (1935–2002), Dutch writer
- Dick Boer (born 1957), Dutch businessman, CEO of Ahold Delhaize
- Dick Boer (born 1939), Dutch theologist
- Diederik Boer (born 1980), Dutch football goalkeeper
- Geert Egberts Boer (1832–1904), Dutch-born American college president
- Jan Gerard Wessels Boer (1936–2019), Dutch plant taxonomist
- Jo Boer (1907–1993), Dutch novelist
- Jonnie Boer (1965–2025), Dutch chef
- Margot Boer (born 1985), Dutch speed skater
- Moreno Boer (born 1977), Italian weightlifter
- Richard Constant Boer (1863–1929), Dutch scholar of Old Norse
- Robbert-Kees Boer (born 1981), Dutch speed skater
- Thorsten Boer (born 1969), German football striker and manager

Boër / Böer

- Johann Lucas Boër (1751–1835), German doctor
- Karl Wolfgang Böer (1926–2018), German solar energy pioneer
- Roland Böer (born 1970), German conductor and festival manager

Boere / Boeres

- Emile Boeres (1890–1944), Luxembourg composer, organist and choir master
- Heinrich Boere (1921–2013), Dutch-German soldier
- Remco Boere (born 1961), Dutch football striker, brother of Jeroen
- Jeroen Boere (1967–2007), Dutch football striker, brother of Remco
- Tom Boere (born 1992), Dutch football striker

Boers

- Christiaan Boers (1889–1942), Royal Netherlands Army soldier
- Edward William Boers (1884–1929), United States Navy sailor
- Heleen Boers (born 1989), Dutch rower
- Robin Boers (born 1940s), Canadian drummer

Van Boer

- Bertil H. van Boer (born 1982), American musicologist

== See also ==
- De Boer, Dutch surname
- Bauer (surname), German equivalent
