= Boer War (disambiguation) =

Boer War usually refers to the Second Boer War (1899–1902), fought between the United Kingdom and the Boers of the Transvaal Republic and the Orange Free State.

Boer War may also refer to:

- First Boer War (1880–1881), fought between the United Kingdom and the Boers of the Transvaal Republic
- The Boer War (film), a 1914 American film
- The Great Boer War, a book by Sir Arthur Conan Doyle
- The Last Boer War, a book by Sir H. Rider Haggard
- The Boer War, a 1979 book by Thomas Pakenham (historian)

== See also ==
- Boer (disambiguation)
