= University of Amsterdam =

Public university in Amsterdam, Netherlands

- Universiteit van Amsterdam
- Latin: Universitas Amstelodamensis
- Former names: Athenaeum Illustre (1632–1877); Municipal University of Amsterdam (1877–1961)
- Type: Public
- Established: 1632, elevated to university status in 1877; 149 years ago
- Affiliations: LERU, UNICA, EUA, Universitas 21
- President: Vinod Subramaniam
- Rector Magnificus: Anniek de Ruijter
- Academic staff: 3,810 (2024)
- Administrative staff: 2,595
- Total staff: 6,405 (2024)
- Students: 43,242 (2026)
- Location: Amsterdam, North Holland, Netherlands; 52°22′6″N 4°53′25″E
- Campus: Urban
- Colours: Red, Black, White and Grey
- Website: uva.nl
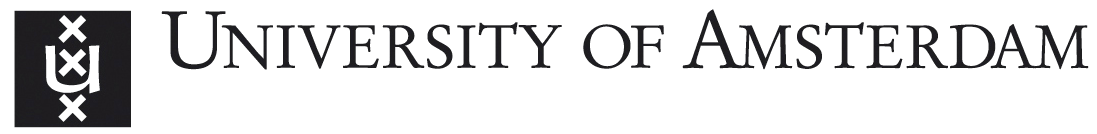

The University of Amsterdam (abbreviated as UvA; Dutch: Universiteit van Amsterdam) is a public research university located in Amsterdam, Netherlands. Established in 1632 by municipal authorities, it is the fourth-oldest academic institution in the Netherlands still in operation.

The UvA is one of two large, publicly funded research universities in the city, the other being the Vrije Universiteit Amsterdam (VU). It is also part of the largest research universities in Europe with more than 44,000 students, ca. 6,200 staff, ca. 3000 PhD students and an annual budget of €1297 million. It is the largest university in the Netherlands by enrollment. The main campus is located in central Amsterdam, with a few faculties located in adjacent boroughs. The university is organised into seven faculties: Humanities, Social and Behavioural Sciences, Economics and Business, Science, Law, Medicine, Dentistry.

Close ties are maintained with other institutions internationally through its membership in the League of European Research Universities (LERU), the Institutional Network of the Universities from the Capitals of Europe (UNICA), European University Association (EUA) and Universitas 21. The University of Amsterdam has produced six Nobel Laureates and five prime ministers of the Netherlands.

== History ==
Early professors at the University of Amsterdam

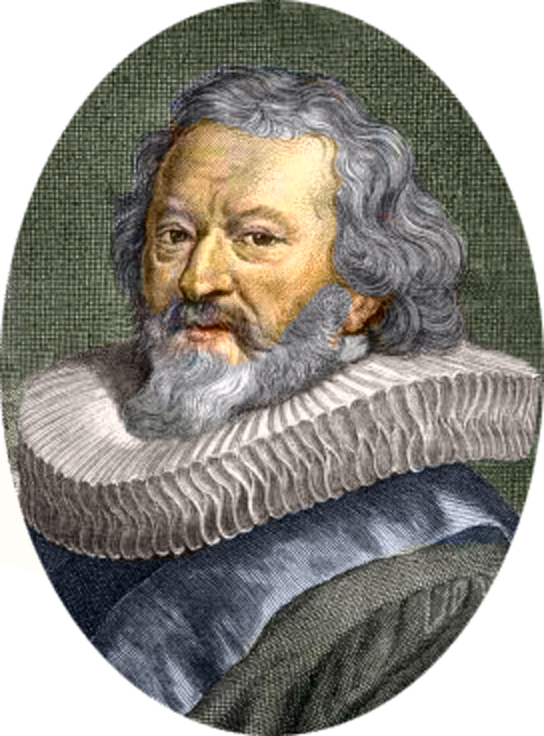
Gerardus Vossius

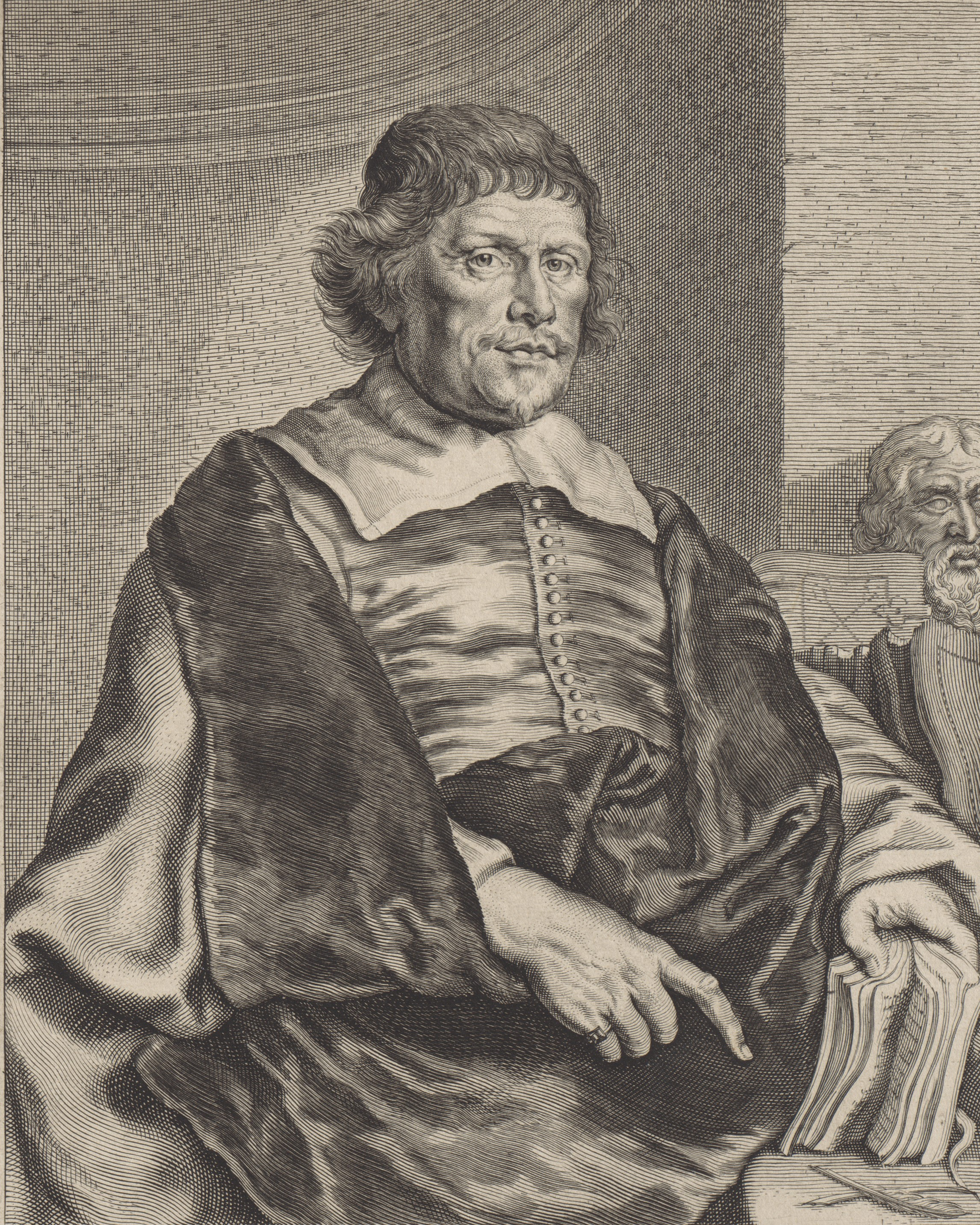
Caspar Barlaeus

=== Athenaeum Illustre (1632–1877) ===
In January 1632, the Athenaeum Illustre of Amsterdam (Latin: Illustrious School of Amsterdam) was founded by the municipal authorities in Amsterdam. It was mainly devoted to medical teaching. The first two professors were Gerardus Vossius and Caspar Barlaeus. The Athenaeum Illustre provided education comparable to other higher education institutions, although it could not confer doctoral degrees. After training at the Athenaeum, students could complete their education at a university in another town.

At the time, Amsterdam also housed several other institutions of higher education, including the Collegium Chirugicum, which trained surgeons, and other institutions that provided theological courses for the Remonstrant and the Mennonite communities. Amsterdam's large degree of religious freedom allowed for the establishment of these institutions. Students of the Colegium Chirugicum and the theological institutions regularly attended classes at the Athenaeum Illustre.

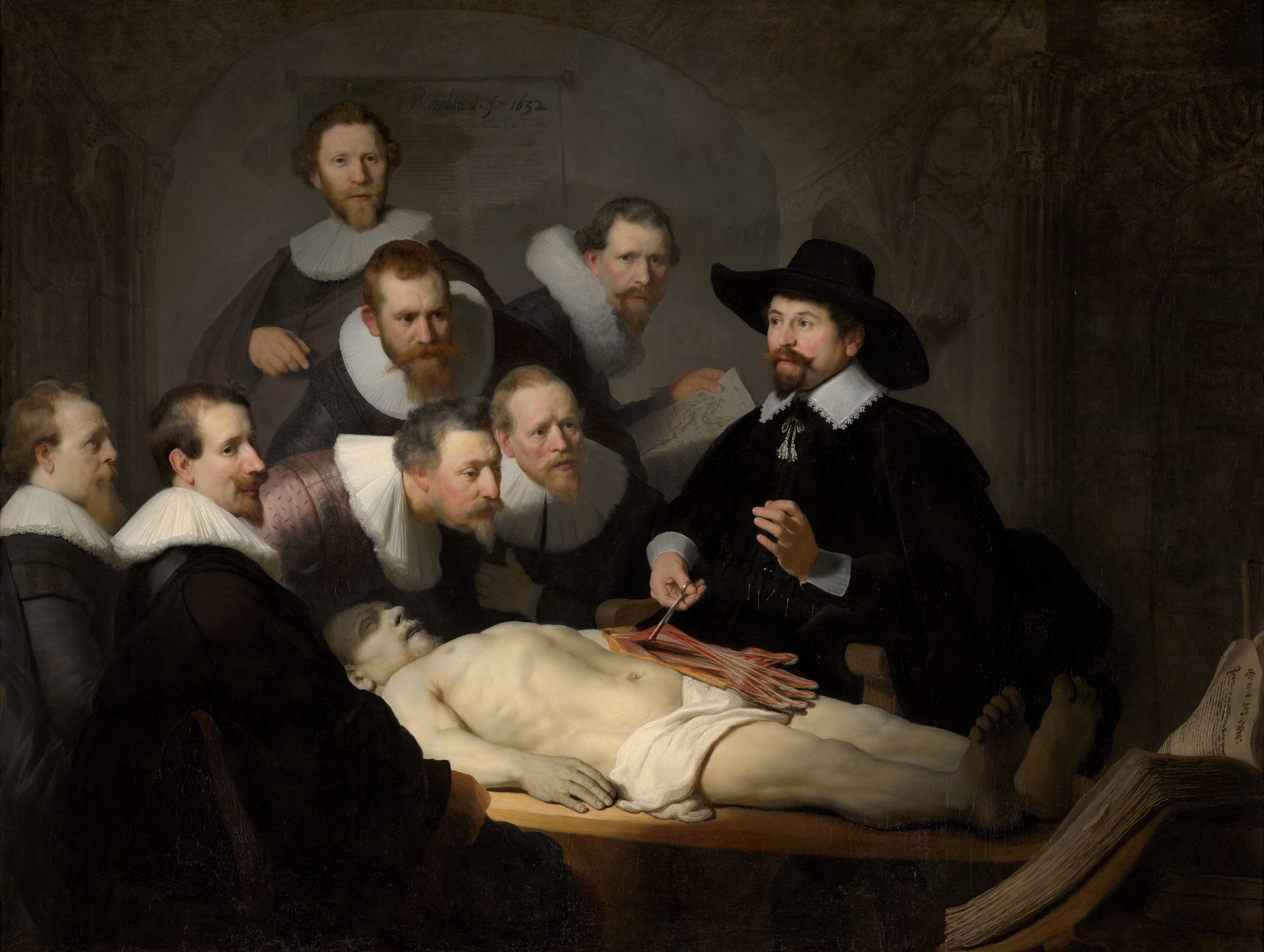
The Anatomy Lesson of Dr. Nicolaes Tulp, by Rembrandt, shows an anatomy lesson taking place in Amsterdam in 1632, the year the university was founded. Nicolaes Tulp is considered one of the forefathers of the Faculty of Medicine.

In 1815 it was given the statutory obligation "to disseminate taste, civilisation and learning" and "to replace, at least in part, the institutes of higher education and an academic education for those young men whose circumstances unable them to fully spend the time necessary for an academic career at an institute of higher education." The Athenaeum began offering classes for students attending non-academic professional training in pharmacy and surgery in 1800. The Athenaeum Illustre largely worked together with Amsterdam's theological institutions such as the Evangelisch-Luthers Seminarium (evangelical-Lutheran) and the Klinische School (medical school), the successor to the Collegium Chirurgicum.

The Athenaeum remained a small institution until the 19th century, with no more than 250 students and eight professors. Alumni of the Athenaeum include Cornelis Petrus Tiele.

=== Municipal university (1877–1961) ===
In 1877, the Athenuem Illustre became the Municipal University of Amsterdam and received the right to confer doctoral degrees. This gave the university the same privileges as national universities while being funded by the city of Amsterdam. The professors and lecturers were appointed by the municipal council. This resulted in a staff that was in many ways more colorful than the staffs of national universities. During its time as a municipal university, the university flourished, in particular in the science department, which counted many Nobel prize winners: Tobias Asser, Christiaan Eijkman, Jacobus Henricus van 't Hoff, Johannes Diderik van der Waals, Pieter Zeeman, and Frits Zernike.

The University of Amsterdam's municipal status brought about the relatively early addition of the faculties of Economics and Social Sciences. After the World War II the dramatic rise in the cost of university education put a constraint on the university's growth.

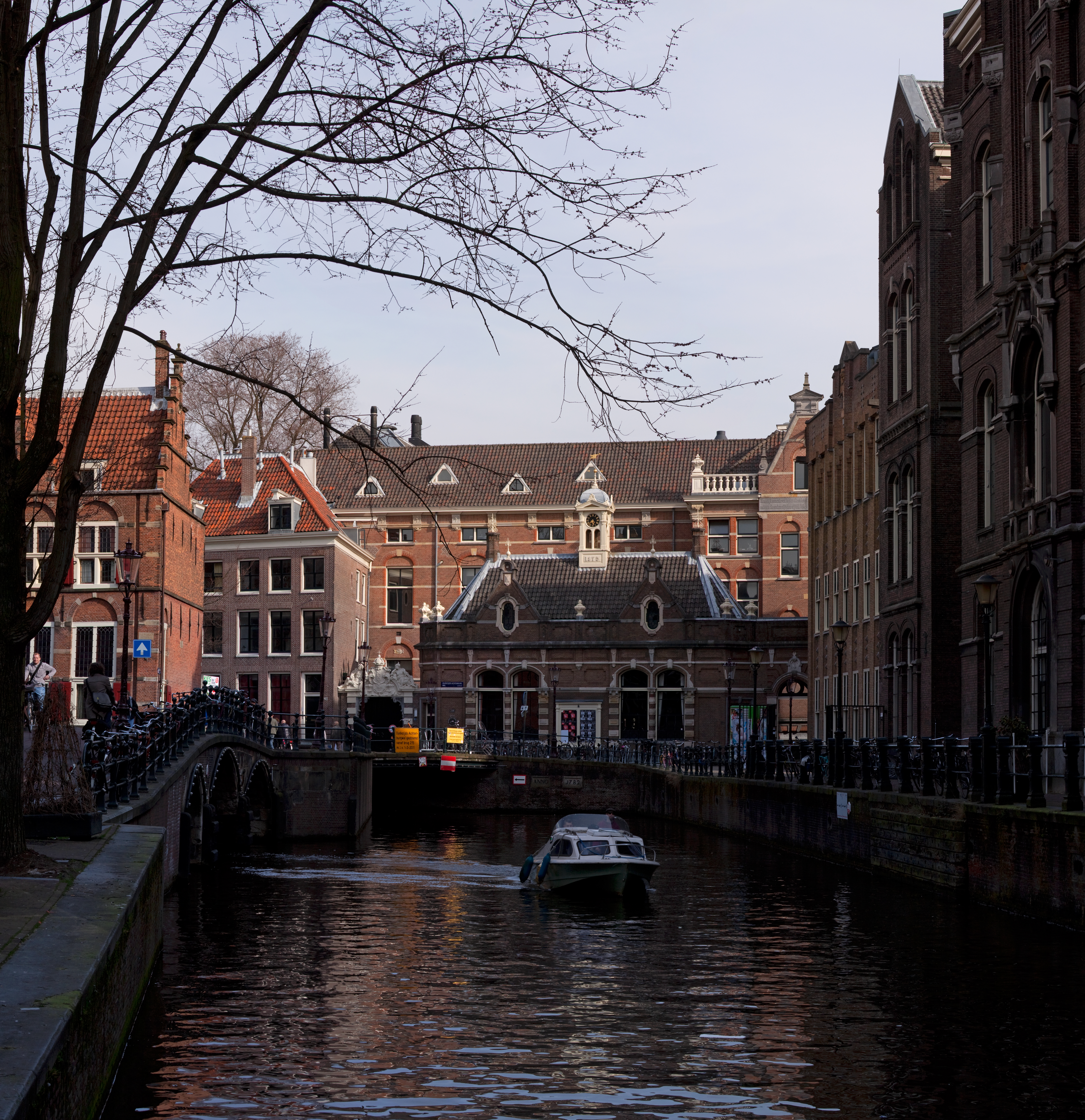
Buildings of the University of Amsterdam. The front building houses the Academic Club of the university.

=== National university (1961–present) ===
In 1961, the national government made the university a national university, giving it its current name, the University of Amsterdam. Funding was now given by the national government instead of the city and the appointment of professors was transferred to the board of governors. The city of Amsterdam retained a limited influence until 1971, when the appointment was handed over to the executive board.

During May 1969, the university became the focus of nationwide news when UvA's administrative centre at the Maagdenhuis was occupied by hundreds of students who wanted more democratic influence in educational and administrative matters. The protest lasted for days and was eventually broken up by the police. During the 1970s and 1980s, the university was often the target of nationwide student actions.

The university saw considerable expansion since becoming a national university, from 7,500 students in 1960 to over 32,000 in 2010. In 2007, UvA undertook the construction of the Science Park Amsterdam, a 70-hectare (170-acre) campus to house the Faculty of Science along with the new University Sports Center. Much of the park has now been completed. The University of Amsterdam began working in close collaboration with the Hogeschool van Amsterdam. In 2008, the University of Amsterdam and VU University jointly founded the Amsterdam University College (AUC), an interuniversity institute that offers a three-year Bachelor (Honors) program in the Liberal Arts and Sciences.

==== 2015 student and staff protests ====
In February 2015, the university experienced occupations of two of their buildings in protest over proposed budget cuts. These budget cuts occurred in the wake of the university's attempt to deal with its speculative misjudgments and financial difficulties: in 2011, the university's total outstanding debt had increased to €136 million. The Bungehuis occupation ended with the arrest of the 46 protesters on 24 February 2015. The following day a group of protesters forced the door of the Maagdenhuis, the main administrative building of the UvA, and began occupying it, once again raising their demands. The occupation lasted 45 days; the occupiers were evicted on 11 April.

=== University logo ===
The current logo of the University of Amsterdam consists of a black square with three white Saint Andrew's Crosses and a white "U." This an adaptation of the coat of arms of Amsterdam which also uses a black background and three white or silver Saint Andrew's Crosses. The three Saint Andrew's Crosses have been said to represent the three plagues of Amsterdam: fire, floods, and the Black Death. Another rumor is that they represent three fords in the River Amstel. These two explanations have no historical basis, however. It is believed by historians that the coat of arms of Amsterdam is derived from the coat of arms of Jan Persijn, the lord of Amsterdam between 1280 and 1282. The "U" represents the word "university" while the colours and three crosses represent the city of Amsterdam.

== Campus ==
As a metropolitan institution, the University of Amsterdam has always been housed in old and new buildings scattered throughout the capital. Because UvA is not a separate, secluded campus, students and city residents readily mix, allowing Amsterdam to maintain close cultural and academic ties to the school. The majority of UvA's buildings lie in the heart of Amsterdam, with only the faculties of Science, Medicine and Dentistry located outside the City Centre. The university lies within the largest megalopolis in the Netherlands, the Randstad, with a population 7.2 million inhabitants.

=== City Centre ===
The administration of the school and most of the faculties are located in the historic City Centre of Amsterdam, within the canal ring which is itself a UNESCO World Heritage Site. The facilities in this area date from as early as the 15th century to the 21st-century. Architectural styles represented include the Dutch Renaissance, Dutch Baroque, Art Deco, Amsterdam School, and International style. The Agnietenkapel, Maagdenhuis, Oost-Indisch Huis, Bushuis, and Oudemanhuispoort are designated as Rijksmonumenten (national monuments). The 15th century Agnietenkapel, where the university was founded was first constructed as a monastery chapel around 1470, but was later converted for use by the Athenaeum Illustre in 1631. The Agnes Gate in front of the Agnietenkapel is a major symbol of the university and dates back to 1571. It was renovated and moved to its current location in 1631. Another area is a former hospital converted into university buildings, the Binnengasthuis, which is considered the heart of UvA. The Maagdenhuis is the current headquarters of UvA and HvA administration. The building was built between 1783 and 1787 and was formerly an orphanage. The Oost-Indisch Huis, the former headquarters of the Dutch East India Company was built in 1606 and now used by UvA. The Oudemanhuispoort was made a university building in 1880. It was constructed in 1602 as a retirement house and now houses some departments of the Humanities faculty. One of the buildings of the University Library complex, the Bushuis, was built as an armory in 1606.

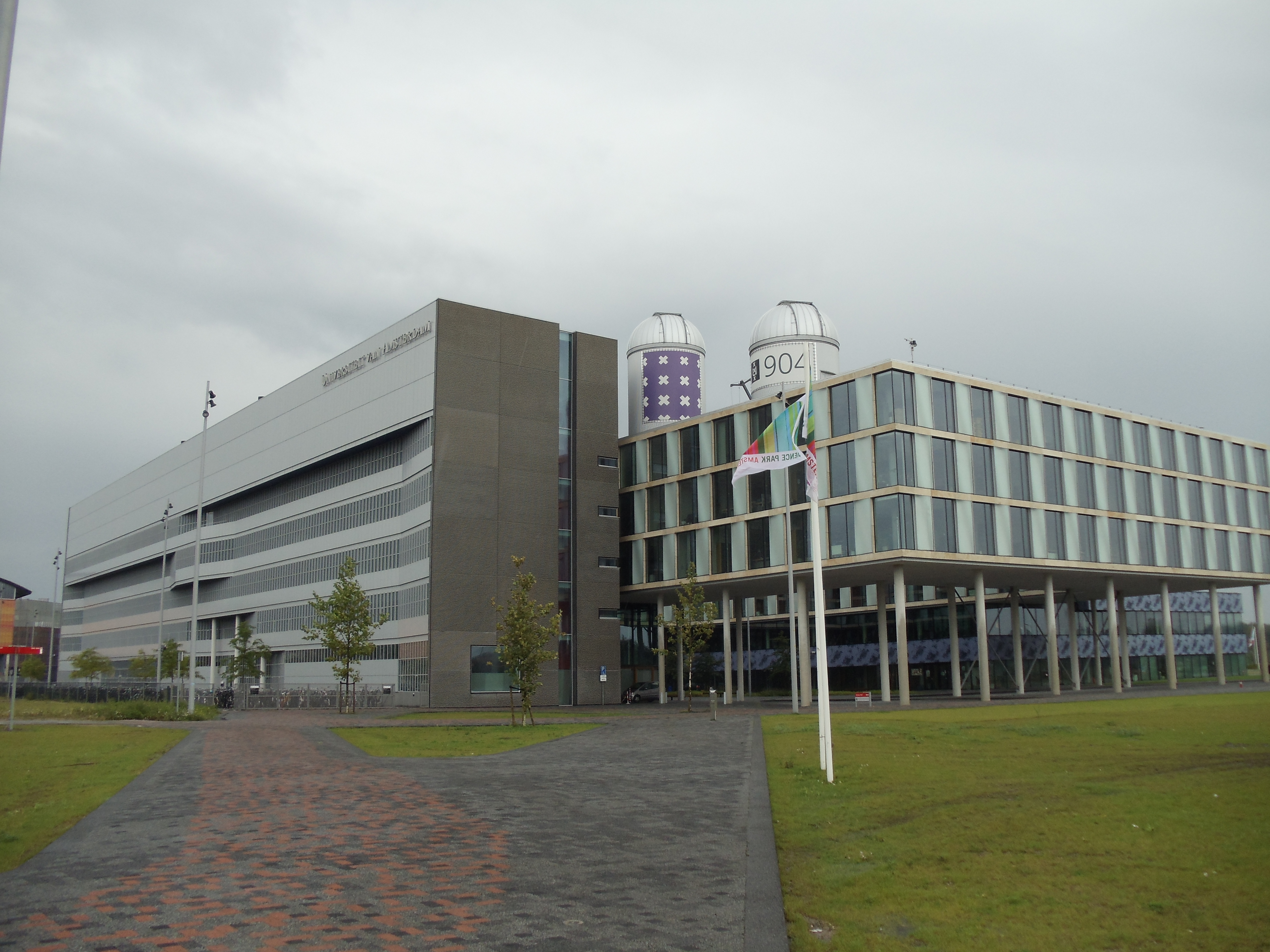
The Faculty of Science at Science Park

=== Science Park ===
The Faculty of Science is located on the east side of the city at the newly constructed Science Park Amsterdam. This 70-hectare (170-acre) campus contains UvA's science facilities, research institutes, student housing, the University Sports Centre, and businesses. In order to attract distinguished students and researchers, the campus was built by collaboration between the University of Amsterdam, the City of Amsterdam, and the Netherlands Organization for Scientific Research. In 2012, the Amsterdam University College was housed at the Science Park UvA campus.

=== Academic Medical Centre ===
In the southeastern Bijlmermeer neighbourhood, the Faculty of Medicine is housed in the Academic Medical Center (AMC), the Faculty of Medicine's teaching and research hospital. It was formed in 1983 when the UvA Faculty of Medicine and two hospitals, Binnengasthuis and the Wilhelmina Gasthuis, combined. Shortly after in 1988, the Emma Children's Hospital also moved to the AMC. It is one of Amsterdam's level 1 trauma centers and strongly cooperates with the VU University Medical Center (VUmc).

=== Academic Centre for Dentistry Amsterdam ===
The Faculty of Dentistry is located in the Academic Centre for Dentistry Amsterdam (ACTA) in the southern Zuidas district on the campus of the VU University Medical Center. It was formed when the University of Amsterdam and the Vrije Universiteit combined their Dentistry schools in 1984.

=== Roeterseiland Campus ===
The Roeterseiland Campus is an open city campus designed to offer future-proof teaching and research facilities. The Faculties of Economics and Business and Social and Behavioural Sciences are located at the Roeterseiland campus. The Faculty of Law has settled in August 2017 on the campus.

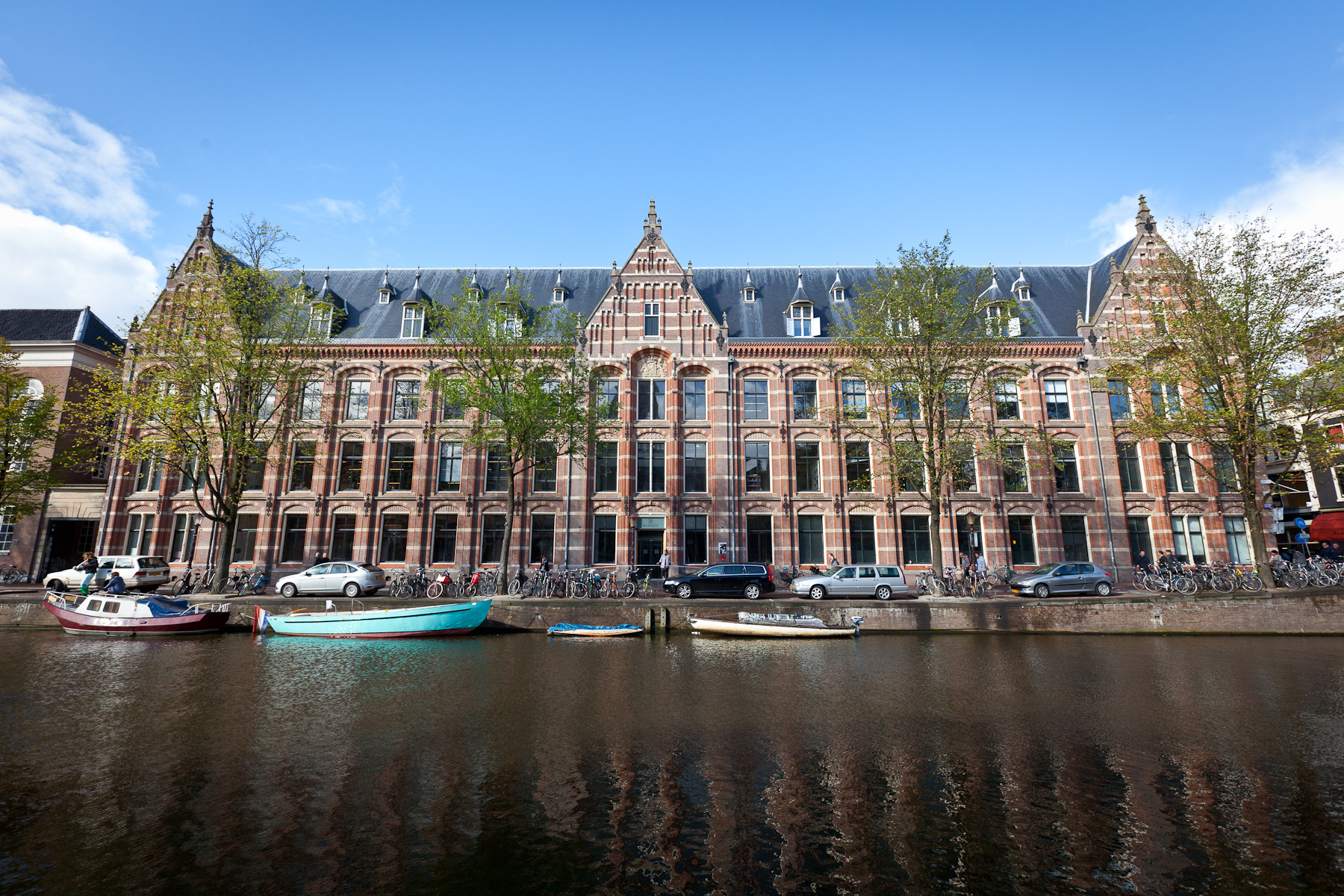
The Bushuis building

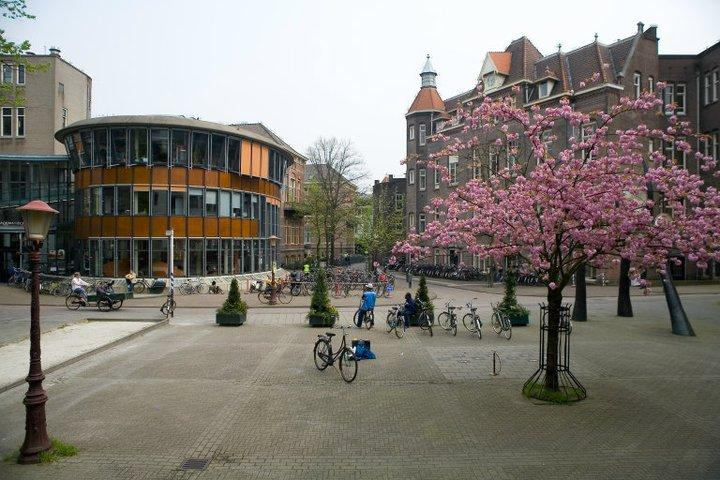
The Binnengasthuis area

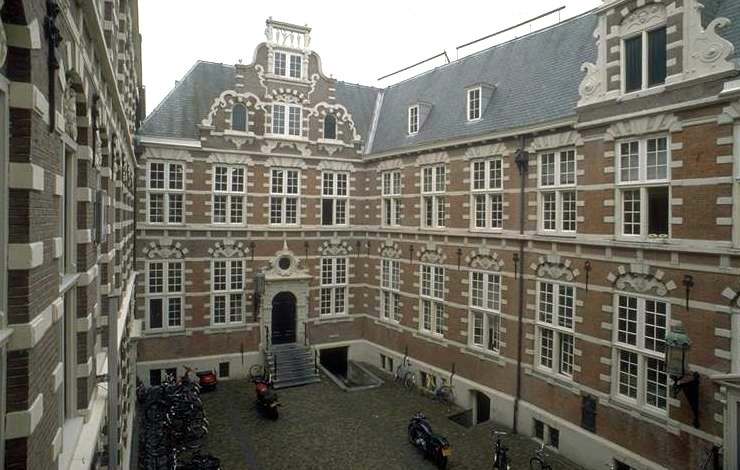
The Oost-Indisch Huis building

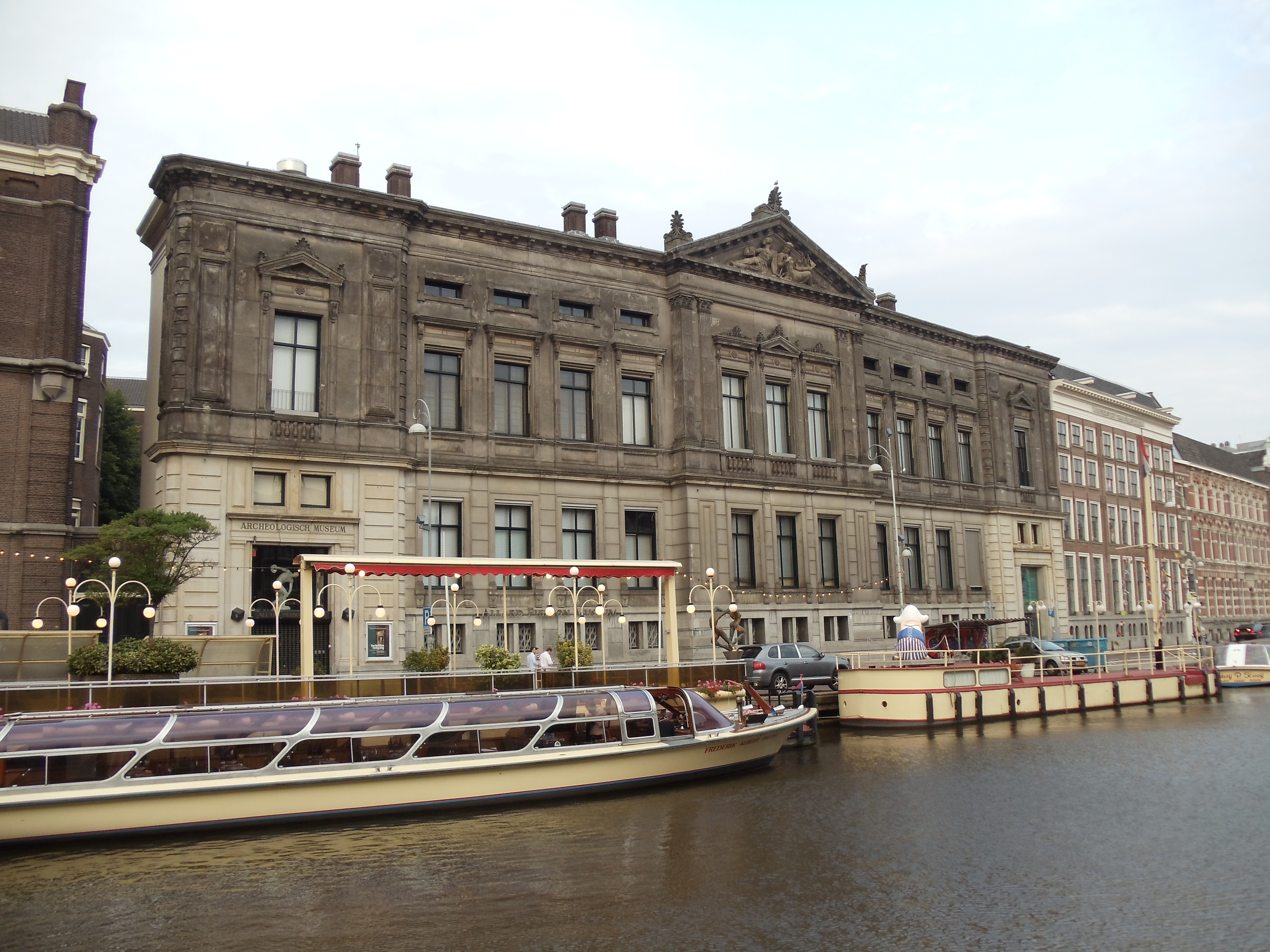
The Allard Pierson Museum

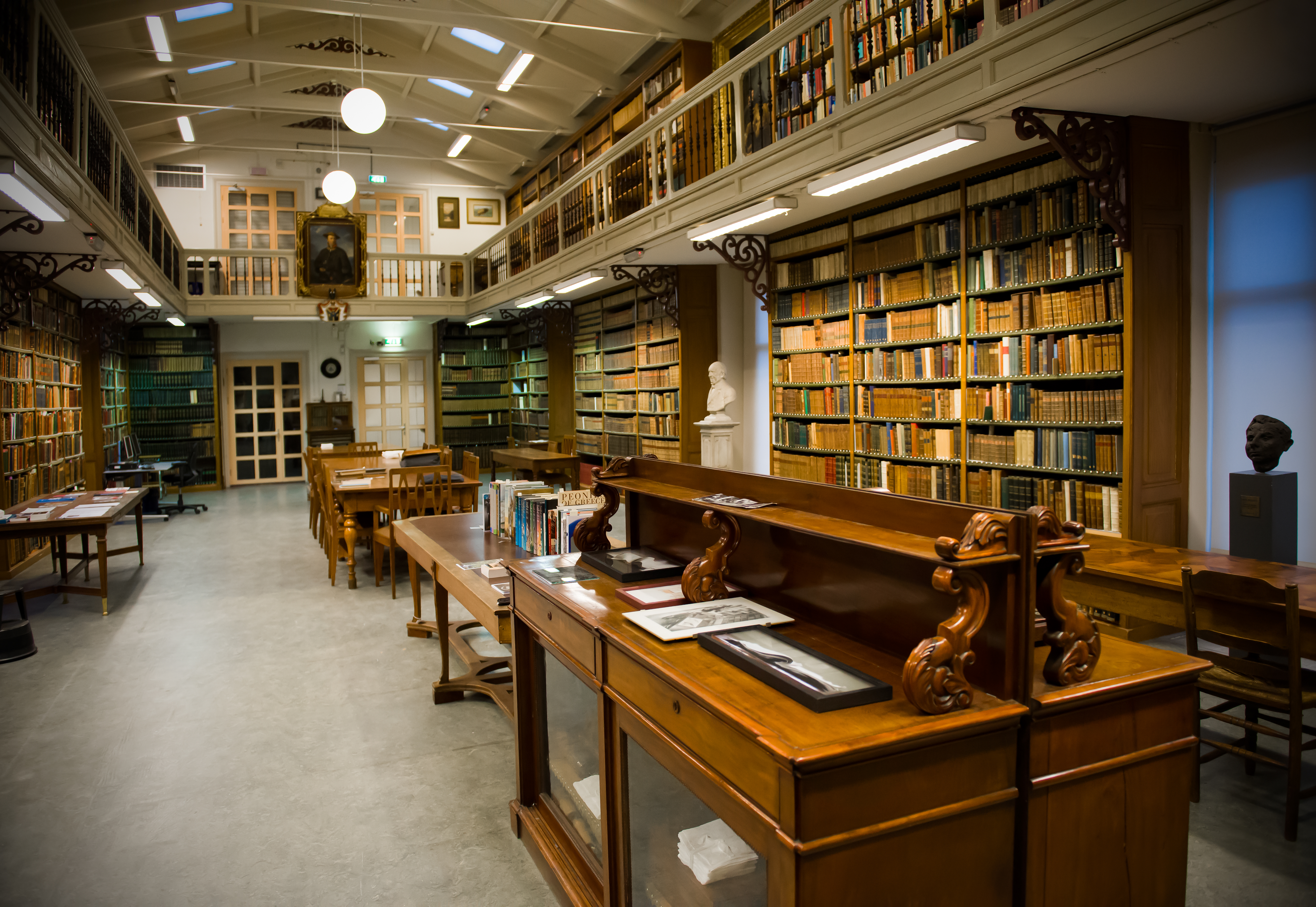
The Artis Library

== Organisation and administration ==
=== Faculties ===
The university is divided into seven faculties, with each faculty headed by a dean. The faculties include the Faculties of Humanities, Social and Behavioural Sciences, Economics and Business, Science, Law, Medicine, and Dentistry. Students must be admitted to the faculty of their program before beginning their studies.

==== Faculty of Science ====
The Faculty of Science (Dutch: Faculteit der Natuurwetenschappen, Wiskunde en Informatica) (FNWI) covers a wide area of research and education. Research at the Faculty of Science covers the full width of the beta sciences. Spread across eight institutes, the main topics are astronomy, physics, mathematics, information sciences, life sciences, chemistry and biology.

The Faculty of Science offers 28 degree programmes for students, 7 of which are a joint degree with the Vrije Universiteit. There are 51 different nationalities studying at the Faculty of Science.

The Faculty of Science has around 6,800 students, as well as 1,700 members of staff working in education, research or support services. Around 50% of the staff are internationals. The main faculty buildings are located on the Science Park Amsterdam campus.

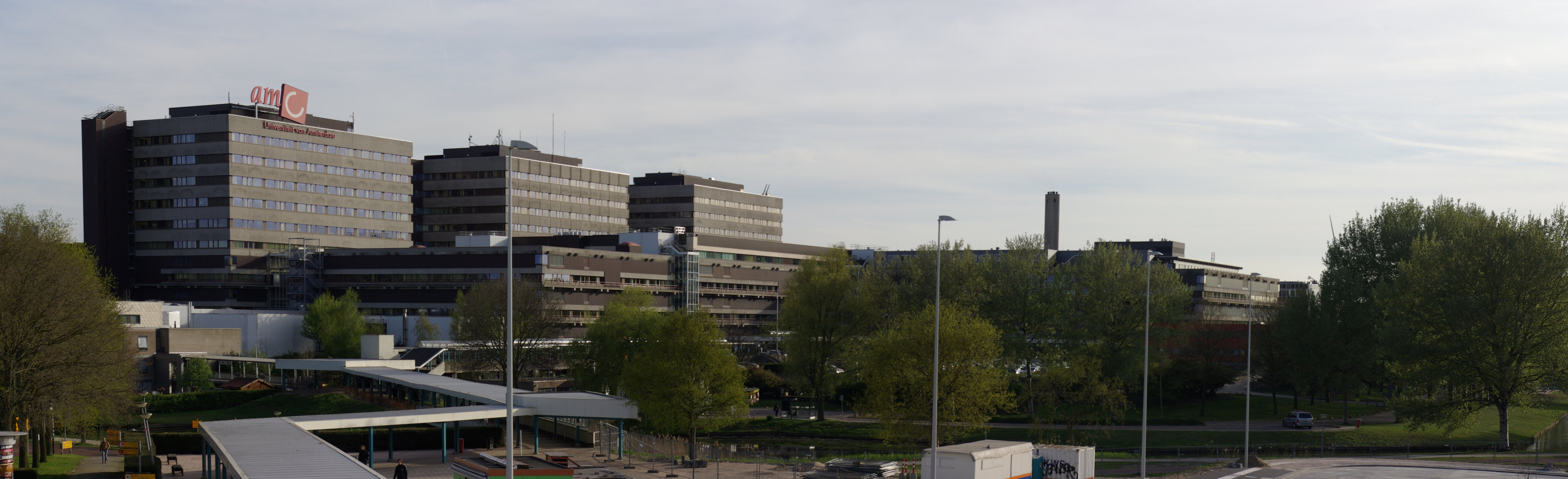
The Amsterdam Academic Medical Center

==== Faculty of Humanities ====
The Faculty of Humanities (Dutch: Faculteit der Geesteswetenschappen) (FGw) comprises six departments: Dutch studies, History, European Studies and Religion, Archaeology and Classics, Language and Literature, Media studies, Philosophy, and Art and Cultural studies. With over 6,000 students and about 1000 employees, it is the largest humanities faculty in the Netherlands. It was established in 1997 after a merger of the Faculty of Language and Culture, the Faculty of Theology and the Faculty of Philosophy. In 2011, the faculty was ranked number one in the Netherlands for Philosophy and Linguistics with international ranking in these areas of 37th and 22nd respectively. In terms of research, the faculty produced 726 academic publications in 2009.

The Centre for Latin American Research and Documentation (CEDLA) is also part of the Faculty of Humanities, with the centre holding one of Europe's largest collections on Latin American information and publishing the European Review of Latin American and Caribbean Studies (ERLACS) academic journal.

==== Faculty of Social and Behavioural Sciences ====
The Faculty of Social and Behavioural Sciences (Dutch: Faculteit der Maatschappij- en Gedragswetenschappen) (FMG) is the largest educational and research institution in the social and behavioural sciences in the Netherlands. The faculty has approximately 10,000 students and 1,200 staff members. The Faculty is home to six departments: Political Science, Sociology and Anthropology, Communication Science, Psychology, Social Geography, Planning and International Development Studies, and Educational sciences. The faculty was ranked the best in the Netherlands in 2011 for Sociology and Geography with international rankings in these areas of 33rd and 40th respectively. In terms of research, the faculty produced 1,366 academic publications in 2009.

==== Faculty of Economics and Business ====
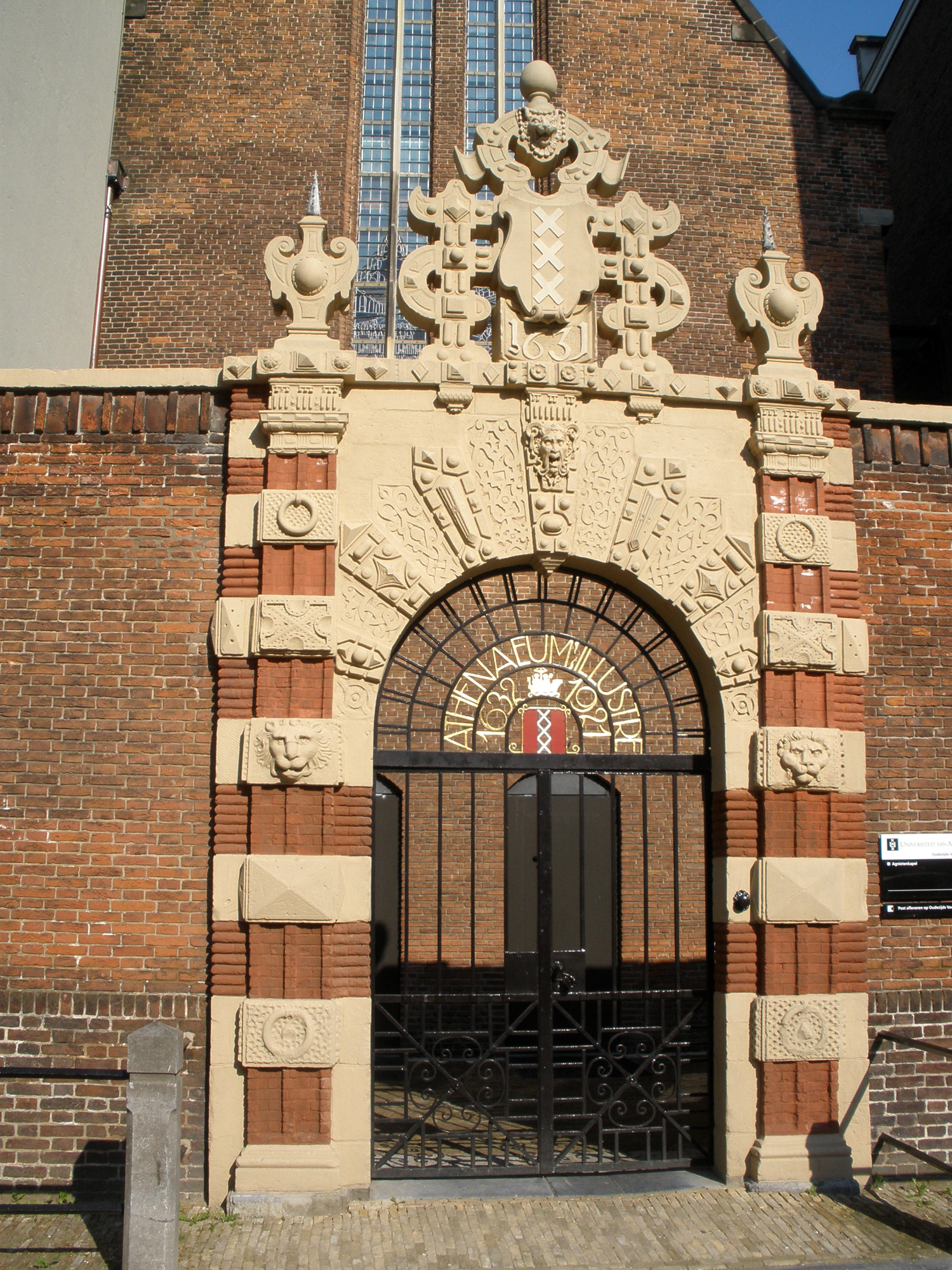
The words Athenaeum Illustre on the gate of the Agnietenkapel

The Faculty of Economics and Business (Dutch: Faculteit Economie en Bedrijfskunde) (FEB) was established in 1922. The FEB, which includes the Amsterdam School of Economics (ASE) and the Amsterdam Business School (ABS), currently has around 4,000 students and nearly 600 staff. It was ranked 44th in Economics & Econometrics and 45 in Accountancy & Finance among world universities. In terms of research, the faculty produced 517 academic publications in 2009. The faculty offers a range of master's and executive programmes, including part-time MSc programmes in Business Administration (Bedrijfskunde). The Amsterdam Business School holds the "Triple Crown" accreditation (AACSB, AMBA and EQUIS), and its MBA and Executive MBA programmes are ranked in international rankings such as those of the Financial Times and QS.

==== Faculty of Law ====
The Faculty of Law (Dutch: Faculteit der Rechtsgeleerdheid) (FdR) is based in the newly redesigned Roetersiland campus. It was earlier housed in the Oudemanhuispoort, a historic building dating from 1602 situated in the center of Amsterdam. It has approximately 3,700 students and 330 academic staff members. 58% of academic staff is female. The Faculty offers nine LLM programs, of which two are taught in English. In addition the Faculty offers three advanced LLM programs, which are all taught in English. Research at the Faculty is undertaken by five research institutes which specialize in the following areas: International law, Private law, Environmental law, Labor law, and Information law. In terms of research, the faculty produced 451 academic publications in 2018. In the 2018 academic year, there were 41 PhD candidates, 67% of whom were female.

In 2015, a bequest from Trudie Vervoort-Jaarsma to the university established the Julia Henriëtte Jaarsma-Adolfs scholarship fund for assisting students pursuing an LLM in the law faculty. The bequest of €4 million was the largest single donation left to a Dutch university by a private citizen and was made to honor her mother's legal career. A second scholarship in the name of Vervoort-Jaarsma's daughter, Madeleine Vervoort, provides travel funds to students.

==== Faculty of Medicine ====
The Faculty of Medicine (Dutch: Faculteit der Geneeskunde) (FdG), each year, approximately 350 first-year students begin their study of medicine at Amsterdam UMC. The first, three-year phase consists mainly of thematic teaching. The second, also three-year phase consists of training internships in and outside of Amsterdam UMC. In terms of research, the faculty produced 3,206 academic publications in 2009.

==== Faculty of Dentistry ====
The Academic Center for Dentistry in Amsterdam (Dutch: Faculteit der Tandheelkunde) (ACTA) was founded in 1984 through a merger of the two dentistry faculties of the Universiteit of Amsterdam and the Vrije Universiteit Amsterdam. ACTA conducts scientific research, teaches, and provides patient care in the field of dentistry. ACTA is one of the largest dentistry education and training programmes in the world, with 500 staff members, an annual new-student enrolment of 128 and a total student body of 1000. It consists of three departments. In terms of research, the faculty produced 228 academic publications in 2009.

=== Administration ===
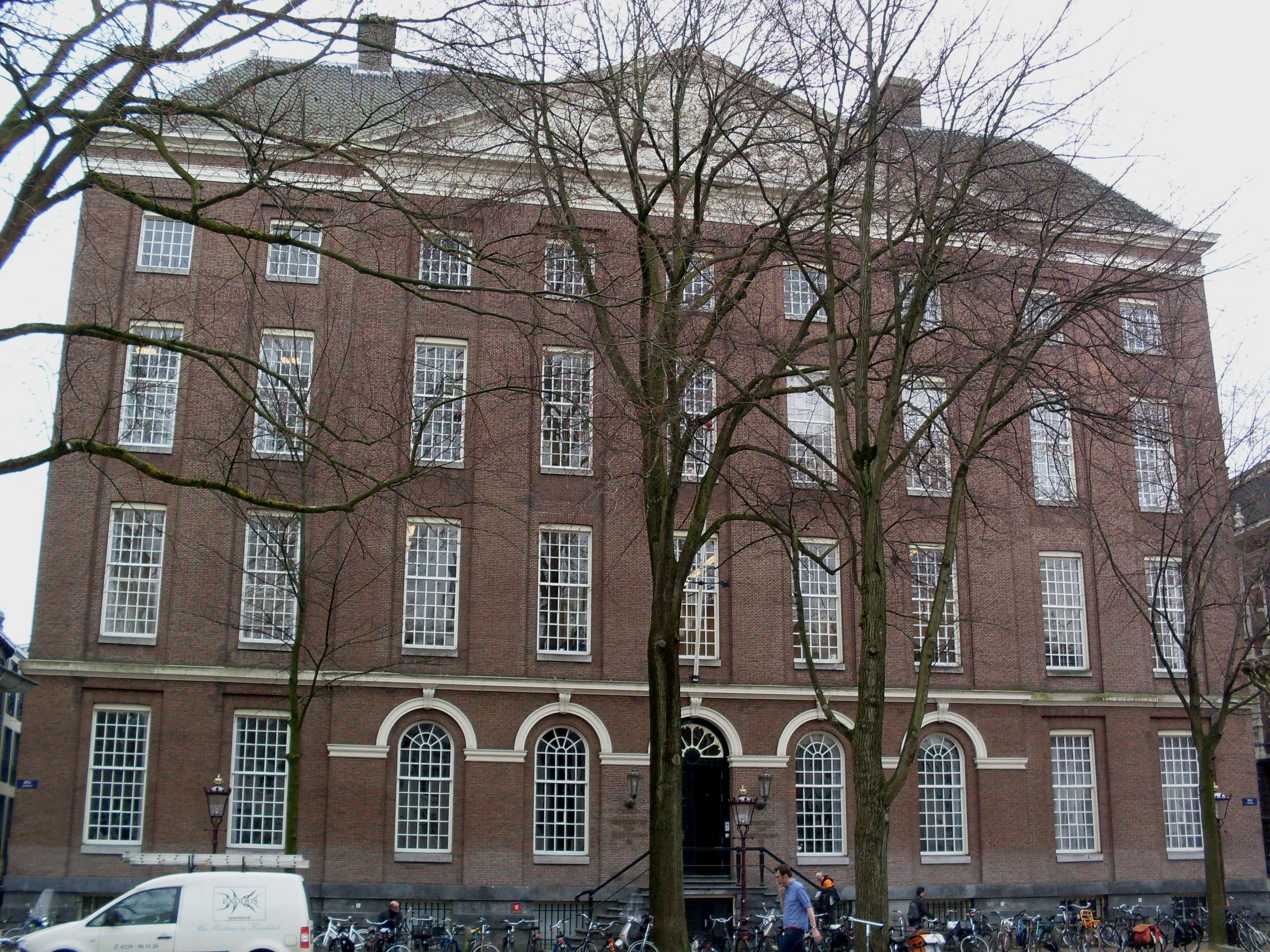
The Maagdenhuis houses the administration of the UvA and HvA.

The University of Amsterdam is headed by an executive board. The university is then divided into seven faculties, with each faculty headed by a dean. Teaching and research are carried out in various departments and institutes within the individual faculties. UvA has an annual budget of €600 million (approximately $850 million),.

In 1992, the board of governors of the University of Amsterdam set up the UvA Holding BV in order to bring its commercial activities into a form that is compatible with private law. The University of Amsterdam holds all the shares of the subsidiaries of the holding. The subsidiaries are clustered into four activity areas which are increasingly outsourced to commercial enterprises and other market participants.

=== International cooperation ===
The intellectual and cultural atmosphere at UvA is internationally oriented. Amsterdam attracts students from the Netherlands and beyond: with over 2,500 international students and researchers from over 100 countries.

UvA has an extensive network of foreign partner universities, facilitating student and staff exchanges. Within Europe, UvA has Socrates/Erasmus exchange agreements with over 200 institutions. Outside Europe, it has close ties with approximately 40 universities on all continents.

== Academics ==
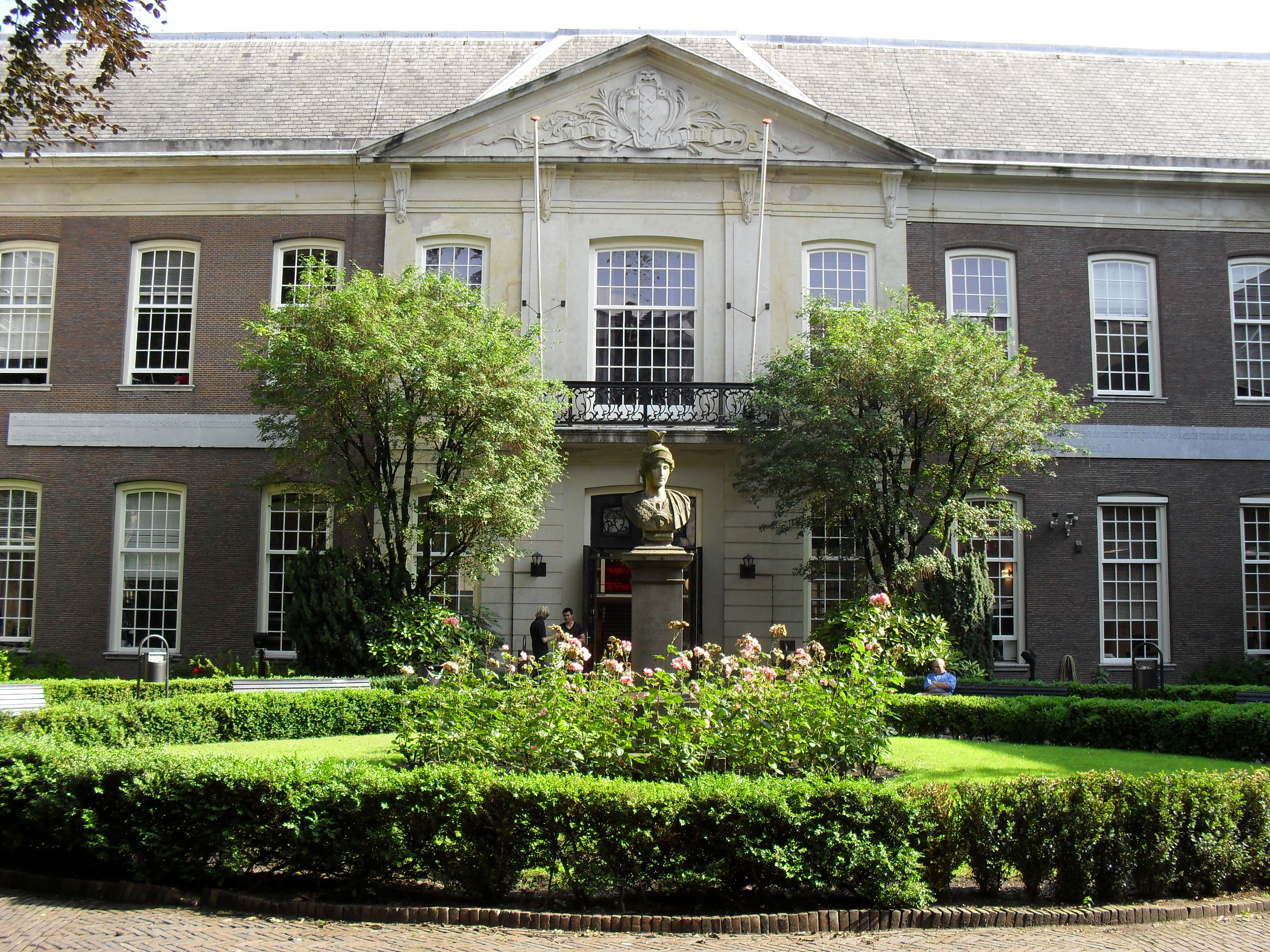
The Oudemanhuispoort building

The university is accredited by the Dutch Ministry of Education, Culture and Science, which grants accreditation to institutions who meet a national system of regulations and quality assurance controls. The Ministry has given it WO, or research university status. Dutch students must complete a six-year preparatory program to gain admission to national research universities. Only fifteen percent of students pass this preparatory program.

In terms of tuition in 2015–2016, EU full-time students are charged €1,951 per year for both Bachelor's and Master's programs, part-time students are charged €1,696 and non-EU students are charged between €9,000-€25,000 per year for Bachelor's programs and €10,500-€25,000 for Master's and Doctoral programs. Costs for non-EU students varies depending on the faculty of matriculation. In terms of scholarships, the university offers the UvA Amsterdam Excellence Scholarship (AES), Amsterdam Merit Scholarships, scholarships through the Dutch Ministry of Education, Culture and Science, Dutch Study Grants, and various European scholarships.

Collectively the faculties offer 59 Bachelor's programmes, 133 Master's programmes, and 10 postgraduate programs. The university awarded 2,565 propaedeutic, 3,204 Bachelor's, 3,990 Master's, 438 Doctoral, 242 Post-Doctoral degrees in 2009–2010, and 10,438 total degrees in 2009–2010. The school's academic year lasts from early September until mid-July and is divided into two 20-week semesters. The first of these ends in late January and the second begins in early February. There are no mid-term breaks, only a short holiday around Christmas and New Year as well as Dutch National holidays.

Demographics of the student body
1. Dutch (65.0%)
2. Other EEA citizen (22.0%)
3. Non-European (13.0%)

=== Student body ===
In 2010, the university had an enrolment of 32,739 students: 20,185 undergraduate students, 9,361 master's students, 1,235 doctoral students, and 412 post-doctoral students. Of all students, 66% are Dutch citizens and 34% are international students. UvA has over 2,500 international students and researchers that come from over 100 countries. Full-time students comprised 91% of the student body. In 2010 students were enrolled in 7 faculties and the Amsterdam University College: 24% in Humanities, 13% in Law, 7% in Medicine, 1% in Dentistry, 11% in Science, 13% in Economics & Business, 30% in Social & Behavioral Sciences, and 0.5% in the Amsterdam University College.

Overall, 20% of students in bachelor's programs complete their degree within three years, 48% in four years, and 69% in five years; 71% of master's students completed their degree in two years. Students on average successfully complete 44 ECTS credits during the academic year. In 2007, 88% of master's and doctoral graduates went on to paying jobs, with an additional 5% going on to continue their education within 1.5 years of graduating.

=== University rankings ===
University rankings

Global – Overall
- ARWU World: 101-150 (2025)
- CWUR World: 83 (2026)
- CWTS World: 52 (2022)
- QS World: 60 (2027)
- THE World: =62 (2026)
- USNWR Global: =39 (2026-27)

According to the US News rankings of Best Global Universities the UvA is ranked among the top 10 best universities in Europe. Furthermore, the UvA is ranked 53d in the 2023-2024 QS World University Rankings. The UvA is one of two Dutch universities in the top 100 universities in the world.

In the 2023 ARWU Global Ranking of Academic Subjects, the UvA is ranked in first place globally in the field of Communication. Other UvA disciplines with high rankings include Psychology (8), Sociology (10), and Political Science (15).

The 2011-12 Times Higher Education World University Rankings ranked the University of Amsterdam 30th in Arts & Humanities and 40th in Social Sciences, making it the highest ranking Dutch university in these fields and the highest ranking continental European university in the Social Sciences.

The 2017 CWTS Leiden Global university ranking ranked the University of Amsterdam in the Global Top 8 in the field of social sciences and humanities.

The CHE Excellence Ranking rated the school excellent in all seven categories for research, making it the only Dutch institution to accomplish this distinction.

== Research ==
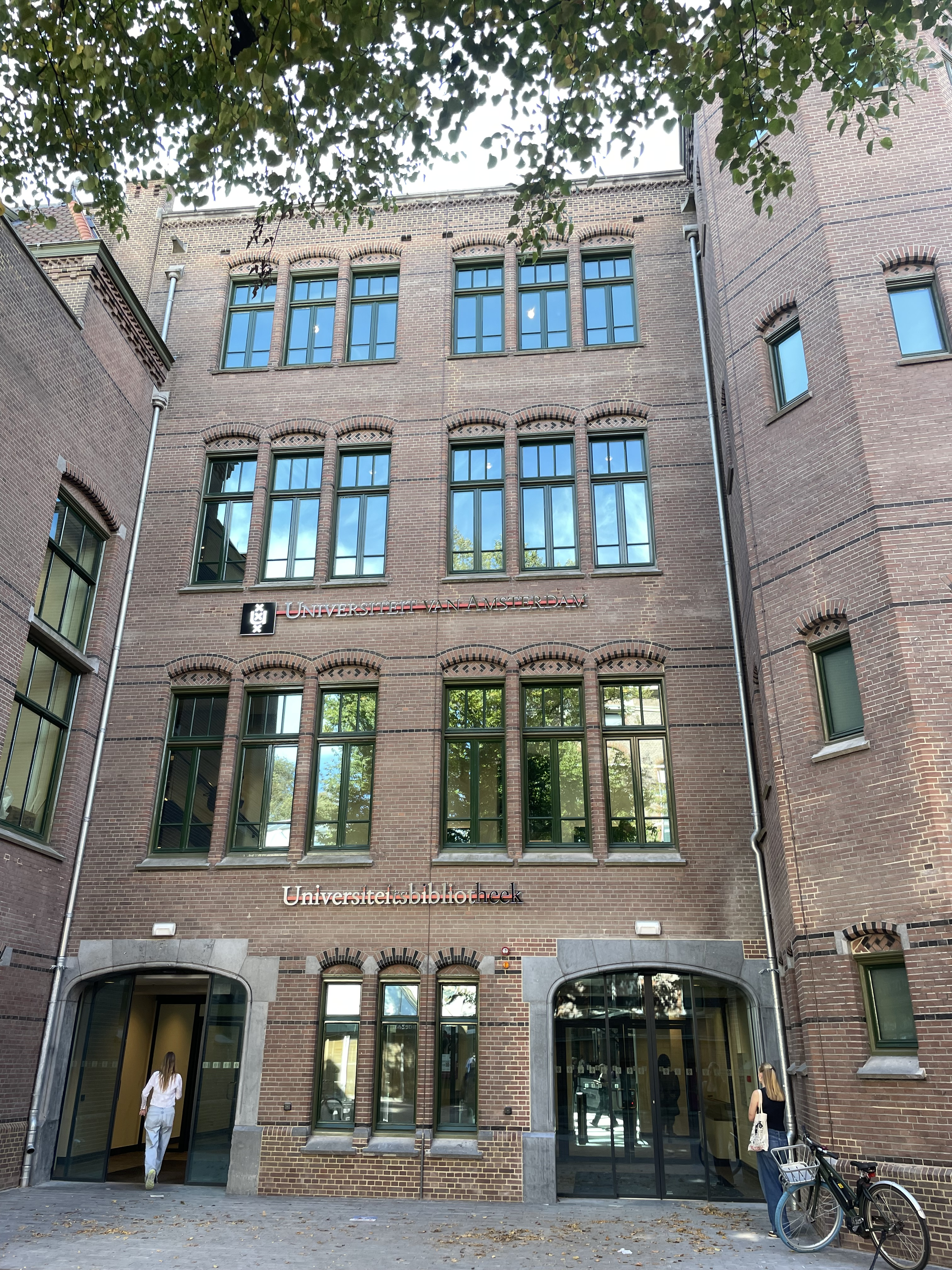
The University Library (UB) is the largest library at the University of Amsterdam.

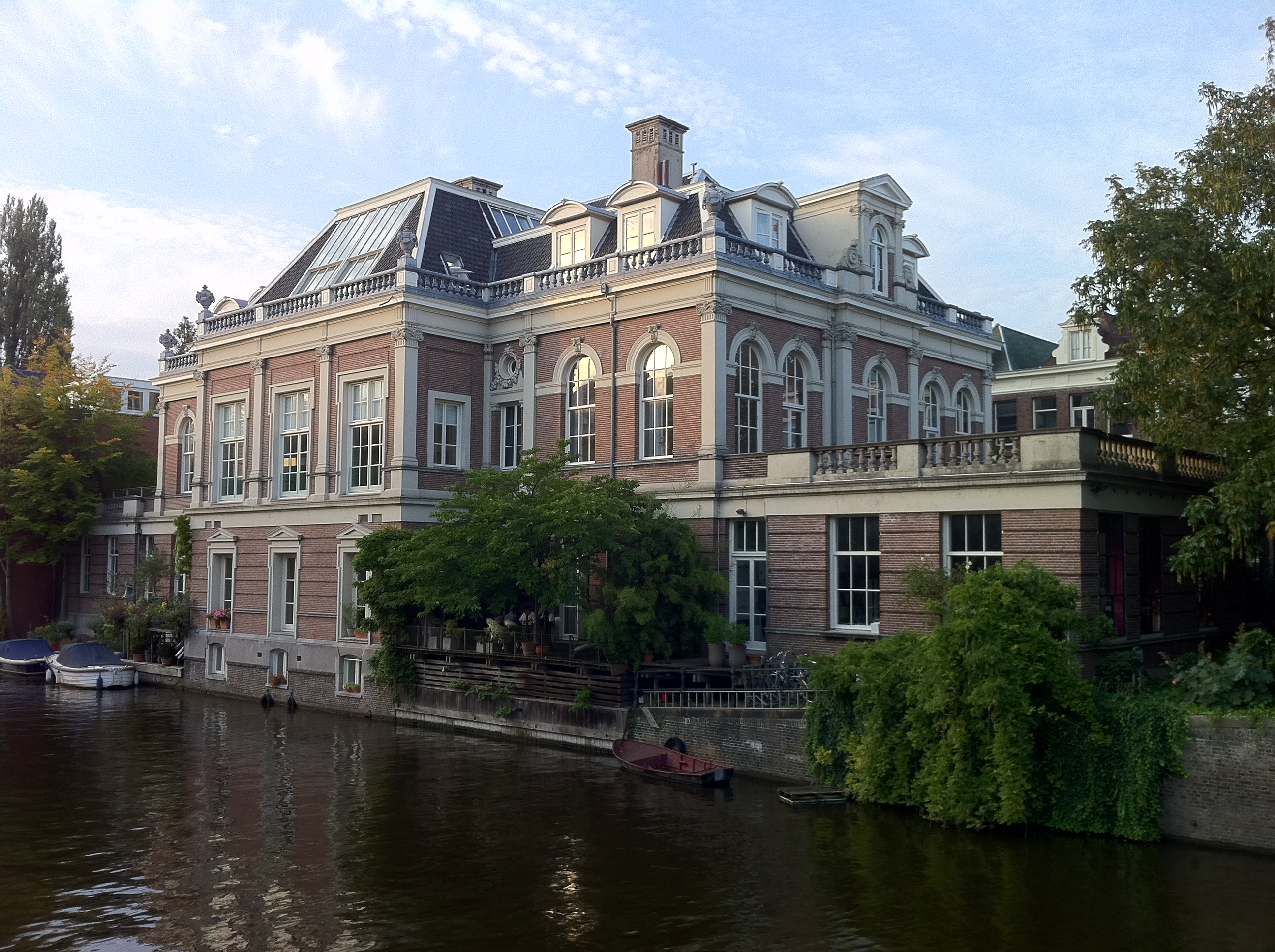
The Plantage Muidergracht Laboratory

The University of Amsterdam is one of Europe's largest research universities, with over 7,900 scientific publications in 2010. The university spends about €100 million on research each year via direct funding. It receives an additional €23 million via indirect funding and about €49 million from commercial partners. Faculty members often receive research prizes and grants, such as those from the Netherlands Organization for Scientific Research (NWO). Research is organized into fifteen research priority areas and 28 research institutes within the faculties oversee this research.

The University of Amsterdam has an extensive central University Library (UB), with over four million volumes. In addition, a number of departments have their own libraries. The main university library is located in the city center. It contains over four million books, 70,000 manuscripts, 500,000 letters, and 125,000 maps, as well as special collections of the Department of Rare and Precious Works, the Manuscript and Writing Museum, the Bibliotheca Rosenthaliana on Jewish history and culture, and the Department of Documentation on Social Movements. Three reading rooms are available for students to study in quiet. In addition to the main University Library, there are approximately 70 departmental libraries spread throughout the center of Amsterdam. The university's printing arm, the Amsterdam University Press, has a publishing list of over 1,400 titles in both Dutch and English.

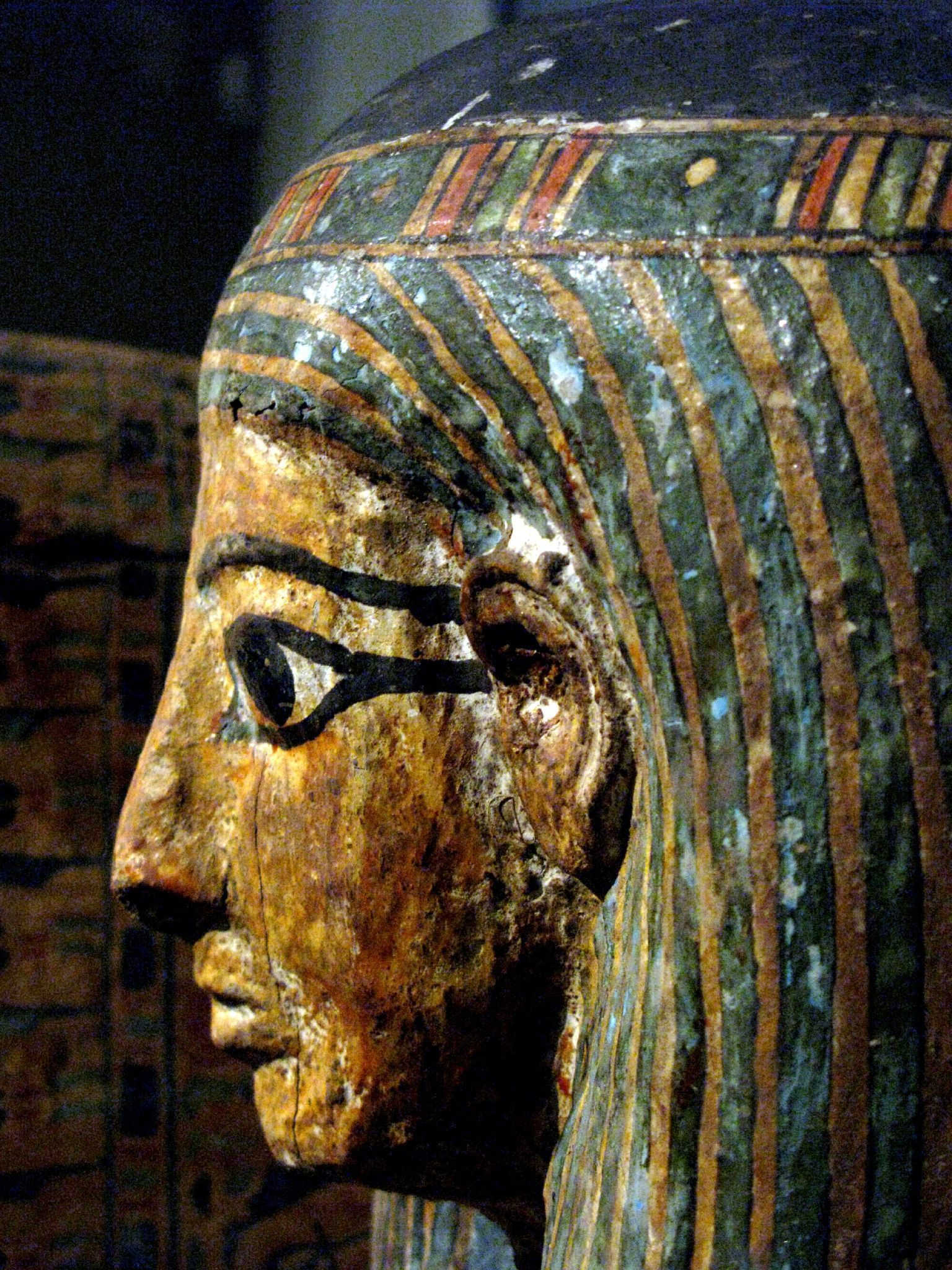
An ancient Egyptian sarcophagus in the Allard Pierson Museum dating from around 1000 BCE

In addition to its libraries, UvA has five museums. These include the Allard Pierson Museum, which houses antiquities from Ancient Egypt, Ancient Greece, the Near East, and central Italy during the time between 4000 BCE and 500 CE; the University Museum, with collections showing the history of UvA from 1632 until present; the Museum Vrolik, which houses anatomical, zoological and teratological specimens; The J.A. Dortmond Museum of Script which has exhibits showing the history of writing in the West from 3000 BCE to today; the UvA Computer Museum which houses displays showing how computers of the past worked and how calculations were made before the presence of the electronic computer; the Zoological Museum Amsterdam at the Amsterdam Artis Zoo contains collection of millions of shells, insects, mammals, birds, fishes and other animals used in scientific research.

== Student life ==
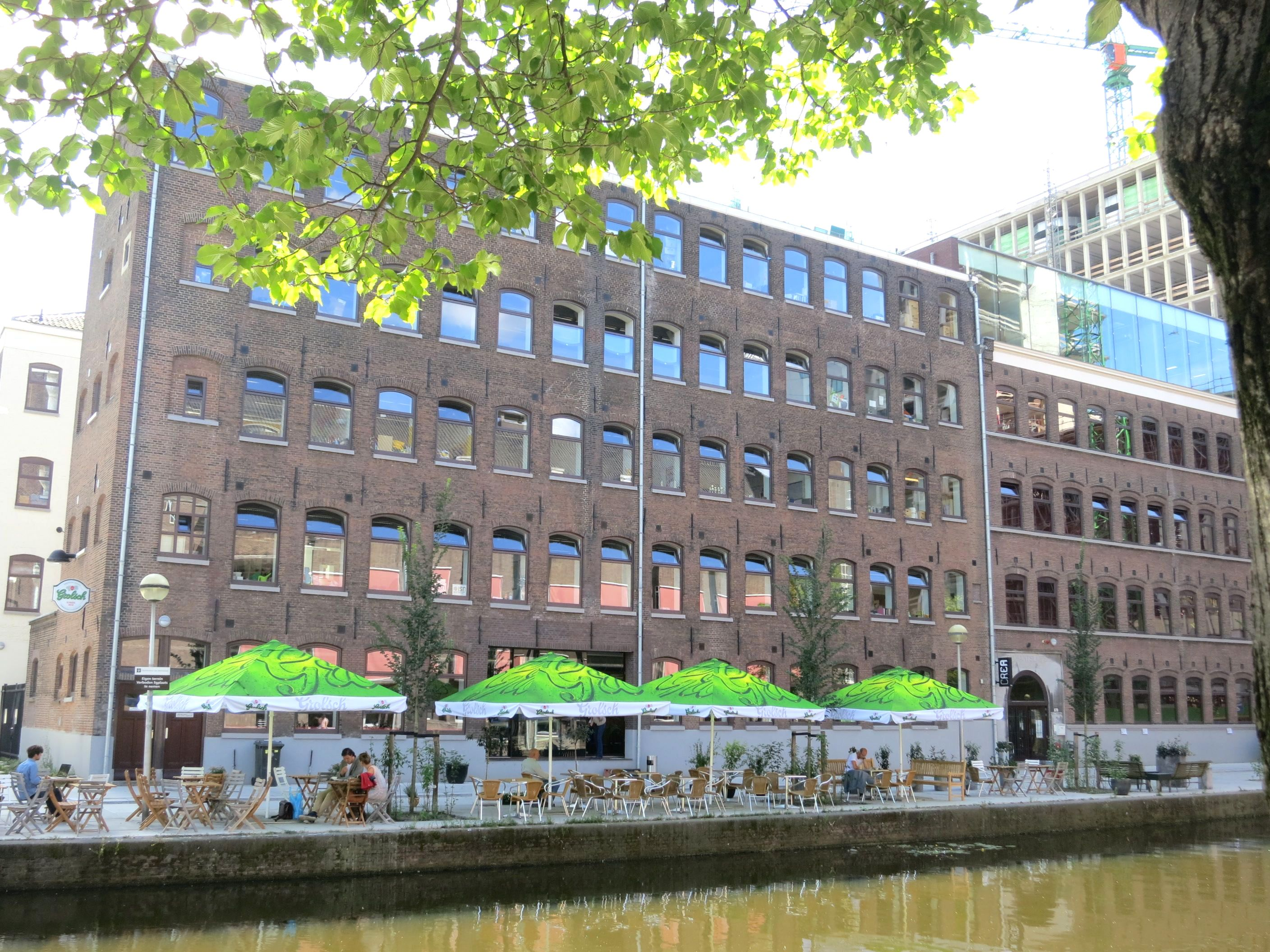
The CREA Cultural Center in 2013

At UvA, students can choose from many student organizations, athletic activities, and student services. These include the ASVA Student Union, CREA Cultural Center, the newly constructed University Sports Center, and the Agora student restaurant. In addition, the university provides religious services, career counseling, the International Student Network (ISN), counseling, disability services, and student health services. The students are represented in the different faculty student councils and the central student council.

The UvA is home to Room for Discussion, an independent interview platform that has welcomed a variety of prominent guests including Christine Lagarde, Mario Draghi, Charles Michel, Rob Bauer, and Sviatlana Tsikhanouskaya.

The University Sports Center (USC) offers over 50 sports activities at discount rates for UvA students and staff including Ice skating, tennis, rowing, aerobics, swimming, dancing, golf, and even skiing.

The CREA Cultural Center organizes courses, working groups and projects in drama, music, dance, photography, film, and visual arts. It also contains a bar and a theater.

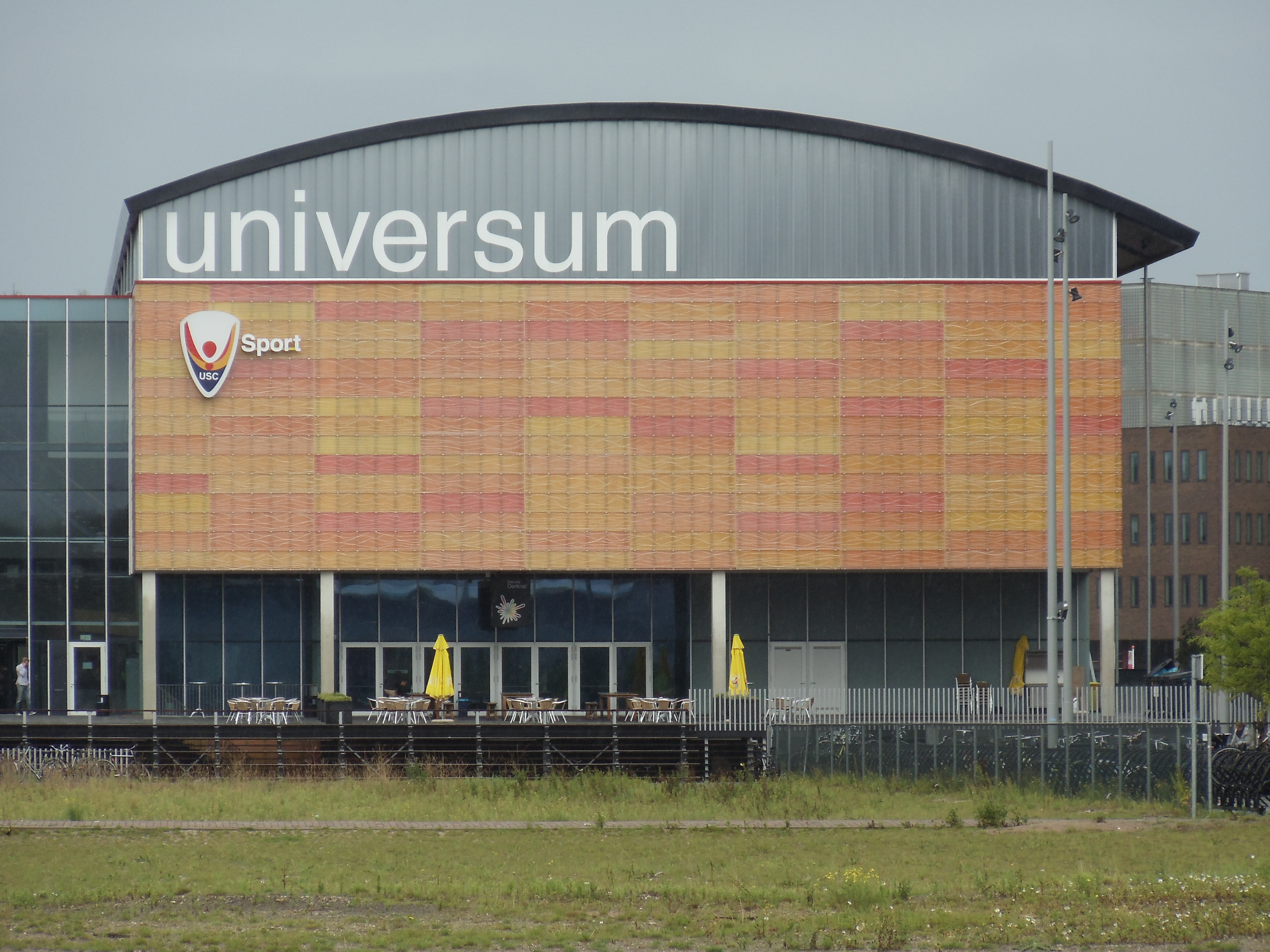
The University Sports Center

The primary mode of transport for students is by bicycle. The city of Amsterdam also has various public transportation options available to students. These include the Metro, trams, buses, and ferries.

=== Student housing ===
The university tries to offer student housing to most international first-year students through non-profit housing corporations not owned by UvA. The housing corporations offer apartment-style housing in the City Center, Zuid, Oost, West, Zuid-Oost, and Noord boroughs of Amsterdam as well as in the suburb of Diemen. Single rooms with private facilities (kitchen, bathroom), single rooms with shared facilities, shared rooms with shared facilities, and couples rooms are available. Students of the opposite sex are permitted to be roommates in all types of rooms. Rooms are anywhere from a few minutes to 45 minutes bike ride to the City Center. Detailed overviews of common student housing options, application timelines, and average costs can be found in external guides that focus on navigating the Amsterdam student rental market.

The university urges students not to go to Amsterdam for their studies unless they have been able to secure proper housing, as the available housing opportunities are very limited.

== Notable people and alumni ==
Professors and alumni of the University of Amsterdam have included six Nobel Prize winners and seven Spinoza Prize winners.

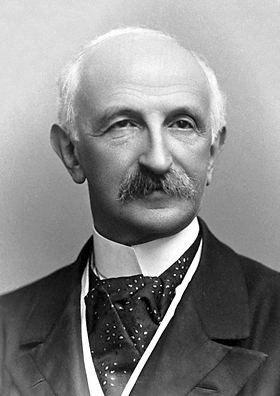
Tobias Asser, 1911 Nobel Peace Prize

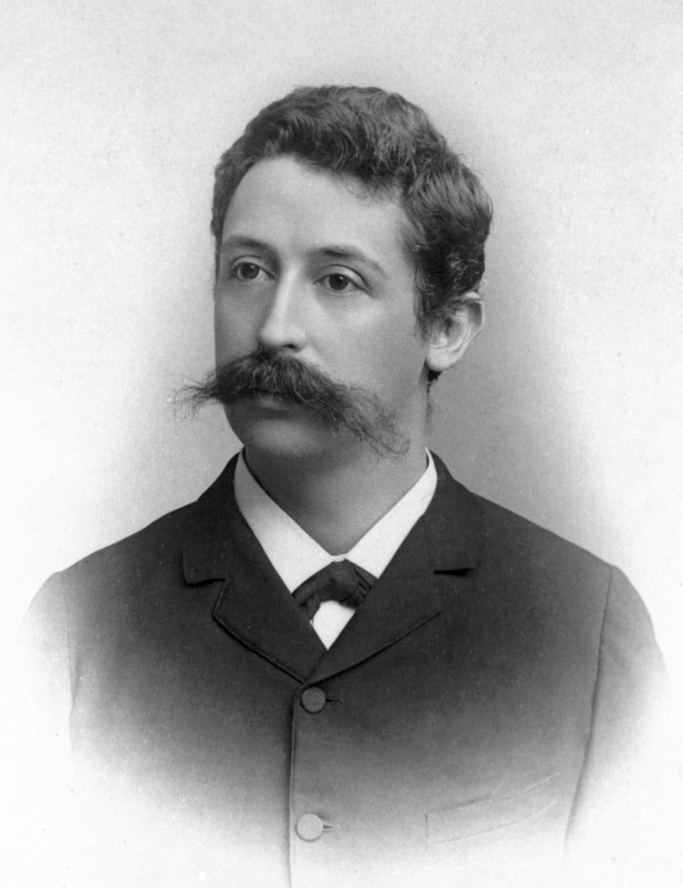
Christiaan Eijkman, 1929 Nobel Prize in Medicine

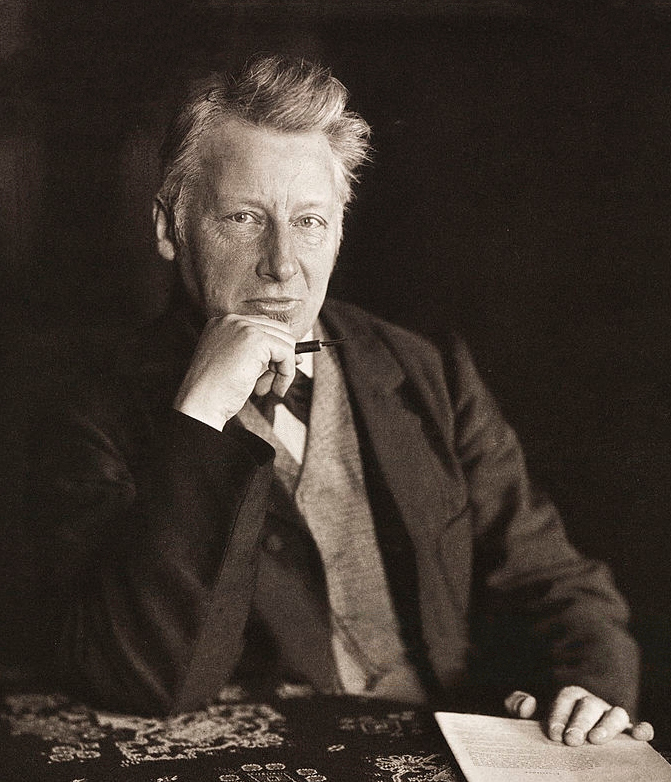
Jacobus Henricus van 't Hoff, 1901 Nobel Prize in Chemistry

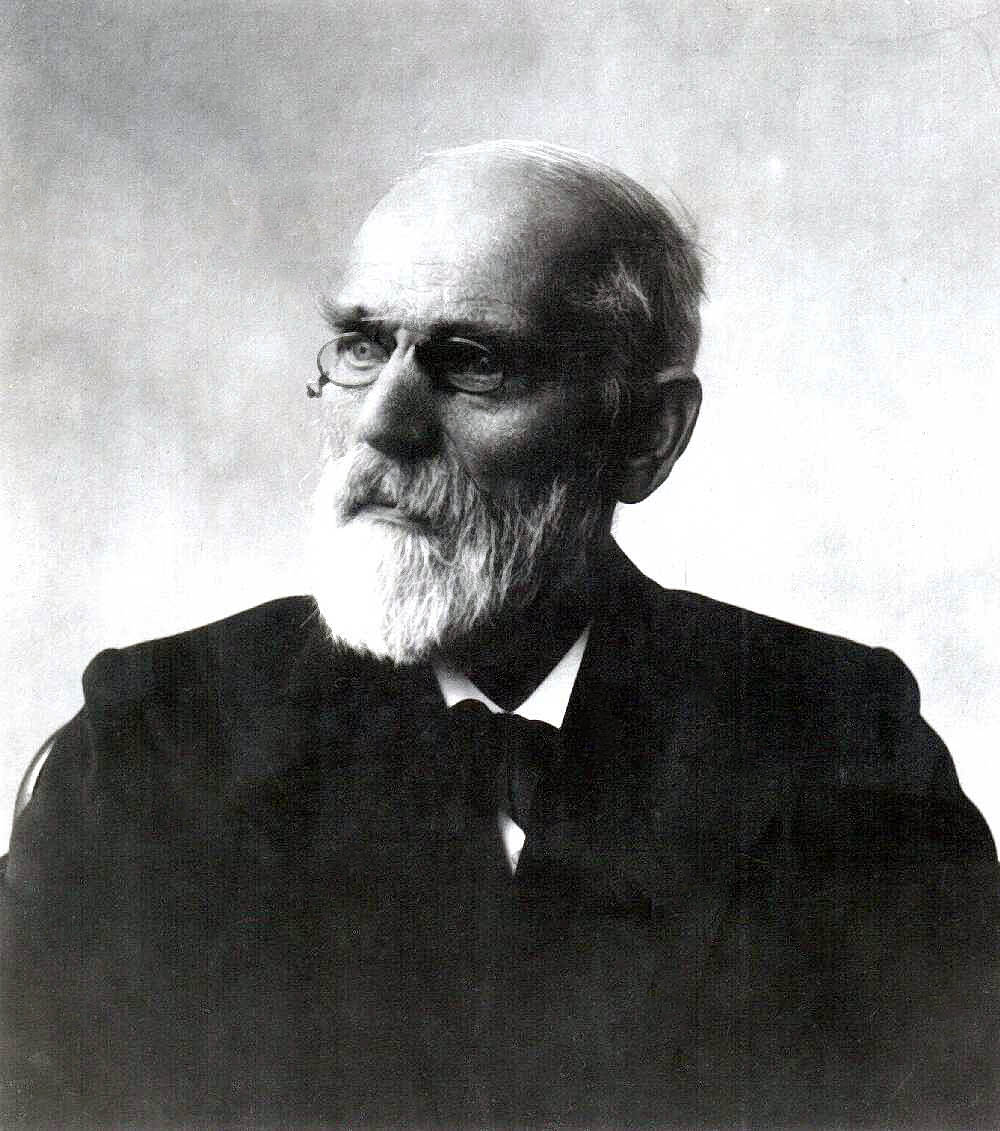
Johannes Diderik van der Waals, 1910 Nobel Prize in Physics

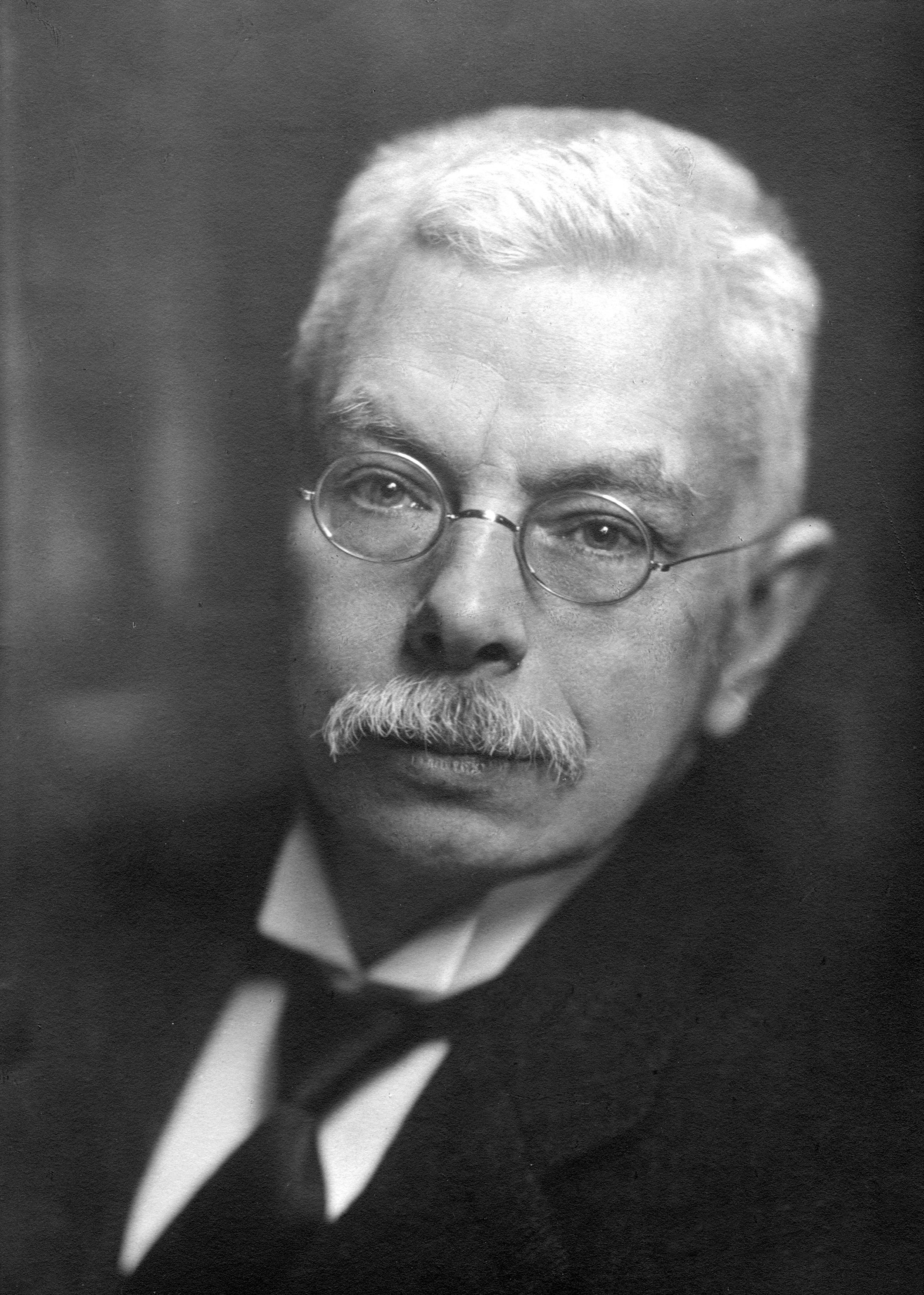
Pieter Zeeman, 1902 Nobel Prize in Physics

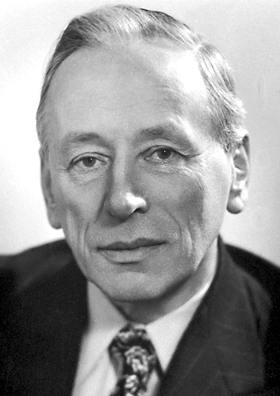
Frits Zernike, 1953 Nobel Prize in Physics

=== Notable former professors ===
Notable former professors include winner of the Nobel Peace Prize in 1911 Tobias Asser, mathematician Luitzen Egbertus Jan Brouwer, winner of the Nobel Prize in Chemistry in 1901 Jacobus Henricus van 't Hoff, winner of the Nobel Prize in Physics in 1910 Johannes Diderik van der Waals, winner of the Nobel Prize in Physics in 1902 Pieter Zeeman, winner of the Nobel Prize in Physics in 1953 Frits Zernike, and scholar of religion, C. Jouco Bleeker.

=== Arts ===
In the area of the arts, notable alumni include cultural analyst Ien Ang, Leiden University's first female professor Sophia Antoniadis, writers Menno ter Braak, Willem Frederik Hermans, J. Slauerhoff, and Simon Vestdijk, Emmy award-winning producer Michael W. King, actor Jeff Wilbusch, art historian Charlotte Rulkens and Roman law specialist Boudewijn Sirks.

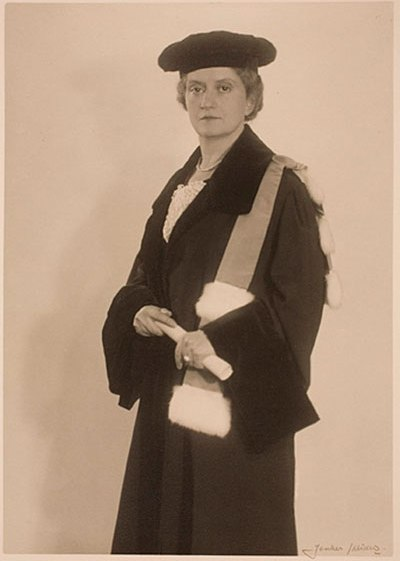
Sophia Antoniadis

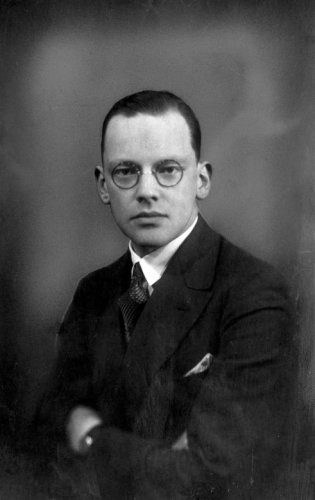
Menno ter Braak

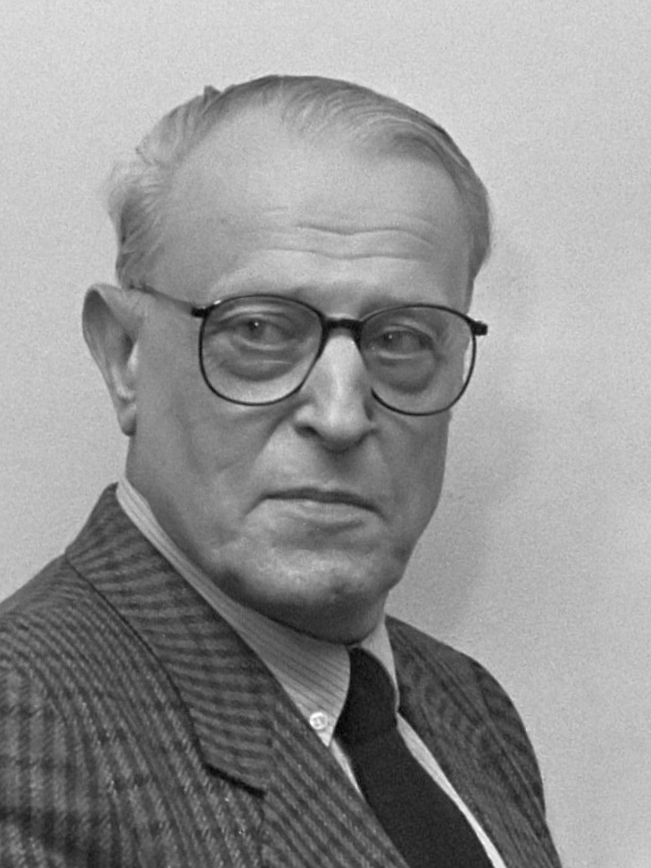
Willem Frederik Hermans

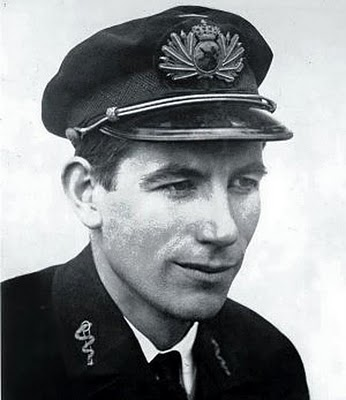
J. Slauerhoff

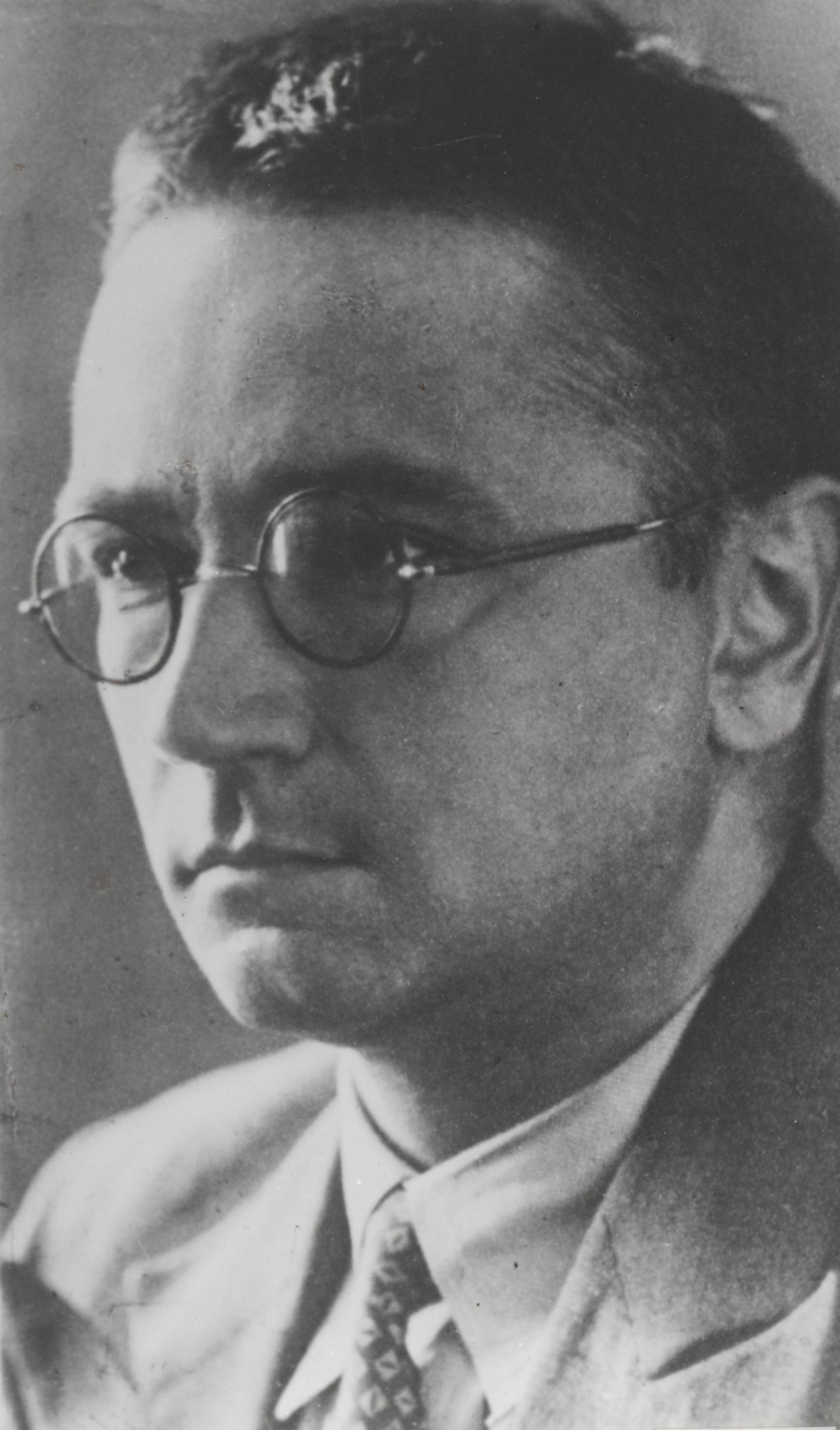
Simon Vestdijk

=== Law ===
- Henriette Geertruida Veth, Dutch lawyer

=== Media ===
In the media area, alumni include Thomas von der Dunk, Dutch cultural historian, writer, and columnist.

=== Politics and government ===
Alumni in the area of politics and government include former Prime Ministers Pieter Cort van der Linden and Joop den Uyl, former Belgian prime minister and president of the European Council Charles Michel, former president of the European Central Bank, Minister of Finance, and president of the Central Bank of the Netherlands Wim Duisenberg, Member of the European Parliament Thijs Berman, former Secretary General of NATO Joseph Luns, member of the Dutch royal family and legal advisor Princess Viktória de Bourbon de Parme, Senate group leader of the Labour Party and former trade union leader Marleen Barth, president of OHIM Wubbo de Boer, former Minister of Defence and former European Commissioner for Internal Market & Services Frits Bolkestein, former Minister of Health, Welfare and Sport Els Borst, state secretary of Health, Welfare and Sport Jet Bussemaker, Minister of Housing, Spatial Planning and the Environment Jacqueline Cramer, Minister of Foreign Trade within the Economic Affairs Frank Heemskerk, Minister of Justice Ernst Hirsch Ballin, Minister of the Interior and Kingdom Relations Guusje ter Horst, former Minister of Social Affairs and Employment and currently deputy director of UNDP Ad Melkert, Minister of Education, Culture and Science Ronald Plasterk and Prime Minister of Sint Maarten Leona Marlin-Romeo.

=== Science ===
Alumni in the science area include winner of the Nobel Prize for Medicine in 1929 Christiaan Eijkman, inventor of DNA fingerprinting Alec Jeffreys, physician and one of the founding fathers of gynecology in the Netherlands M.A. Mendes de Leon, astrophysicist and Dutch communist Anton Pannekoek, string theorist Erik Verlinde, Dutch psychiatrist and World War II resistance hero Tina Strobos, ESA astronaut André Kuipers, Dutch botanist Hendrik de Wit, nutrition education pioneer in Israel Sarah Bavly, Turkish-American high performance computing and supercomputing research scientist Ilkay Altintas, malariologist Arjen Dondorp Menno Sluijter, anaesthetist who developed pulsed radiofrequency pain treatment, Alida Edelman-Vlam, Dutch social geographer, and Anna Petronella van Heerden, the first Afrikaner woman to qualify as a doctor in South Africa.

=== Sports ===
Alumni in the area of sport include Max Euwe, 1935–1937 World Chess Champion. Missionary vicar of the Westerkerk Cristina Pumplun taught at the UvA.

== See also ==
- CORPNET
- Education in the Netherlands
- List of modern universities in Europe (1801–1945)
- List of universities in the Netherlands
