= Alice de Boer =

Medical doctor in Sri Lanka

Alice de Boer (1872 - 1955) was a medical doctor in Sri Lanka, and one of the first women in the country to qualify as a doctor.

== Biography ==
De Boer's family was of Dutch Burgher background. After studying medicine in Edinburgh, Scotland, she was an assistant to Mary Nona Fysh, who was the medical officer-in-charge at Lady Havelock Hospital for Women.
