= Tobias de Boer =

Dutch scientist

- Born: Pieter Cornelis Tobias de Boer; 21 May 1930; Leiden, the Netherlands
- Died: 2 May 2016 (aged 85); Kendal, Ithaca, New York
- Education: University of Maryland, College Park
- Occupations: scientist; sportsman
- Spouse: Joan Lieshout (m. 1956)
- Children: 3
- Scientific career
- Fields: Thermodynamics, fluid mechanics
- Workplaces: Cornell University

Pieter Cornelis Tobias de Boer (21 May 1930 – 2 May 2016) was a Dutch scientist. He was a professor at the Sibley School of Mechanical and Aerospace Engineering of Cornell University. His research interest were in the field of thermodynamics and fluid mechanics.

== Career ==
De Boer was born on 21 May 1930 in Leiden, the Netherlands. He studied mechanical engineering at Delft University of Technology, where he obtained his bachelor's degree and in 1954 his Master's. He subsequently served in the Dutch Armed Forces for two years. De Boer married in 1956 and a short time later moved to the United States where they settled in Maryland. He continued his studies and obtained his doctorate at the University of Maryland in 1962 under Jan Burgers. He subsequently was an assistant professor at the university until 1964.

The de Boer family then moved to Ithaca, New York and he was employed by Cornell University as an assistant professor at the Graduate School of Aeronautical Engineering. In 1968 he became associate professor. In 1972 the Sibley School of Mechanical and Aerospace Engineering was founded and two years later de Boer became a full professor there. He retired in 2000.

At the university, de Boer did research on pulse tube cryocoolers, the physics of shock waves, and Stirling engines, among other topics.

In 1988 de Boer was elected a corresponding member of the Royal Netherlands Academy of Arts and Sciences.

== Personal life ==
De Boer married Joan Lieshout in 1956, the couple had three children. Joan recorded the Dutch text on the Voyager Golden Record.

De Boer was a sportsman and especially fond of cycling. When he was 48 he cycled 448 miles (721 km) in 24 hours, thereby setting a national record for his age category.

He died on 2 May 2016 in the retirement community of Kendal at Ithaca, age 85.
