= Remmelt de Boer =

Dutch politician and educator

Remmelt de Boer (born 1 August 1942, in Steenwijk) is a former Dutch politician and educator. As a member of the ChristianUnion (ChristenUnie) he was a member of the Senate from 2007 to 2011.

De Boer was also a member of the municipal council as well as an alderman of Kampen for the Reformed Political League (Gereformeerd Politiek Verbond) and later its successor the ChristianUnion.
