= Robbert-Kees Boer =

Dutch speed skater (born 1981)

Robbert-Kees Boer (born 18 October 1981 in Woubrugge) is a Dutch speed skater. He was a national short-track team member between 1997 and 2006). He was twice the formal Dutch record holder in 1500m short track speed skating (2004 Madison, and 2006 Bormio, Italy).

== Family ==
Robbert-Kees Boer is the cousin of Margot Boer.
