= Herman Pieter de Boer =

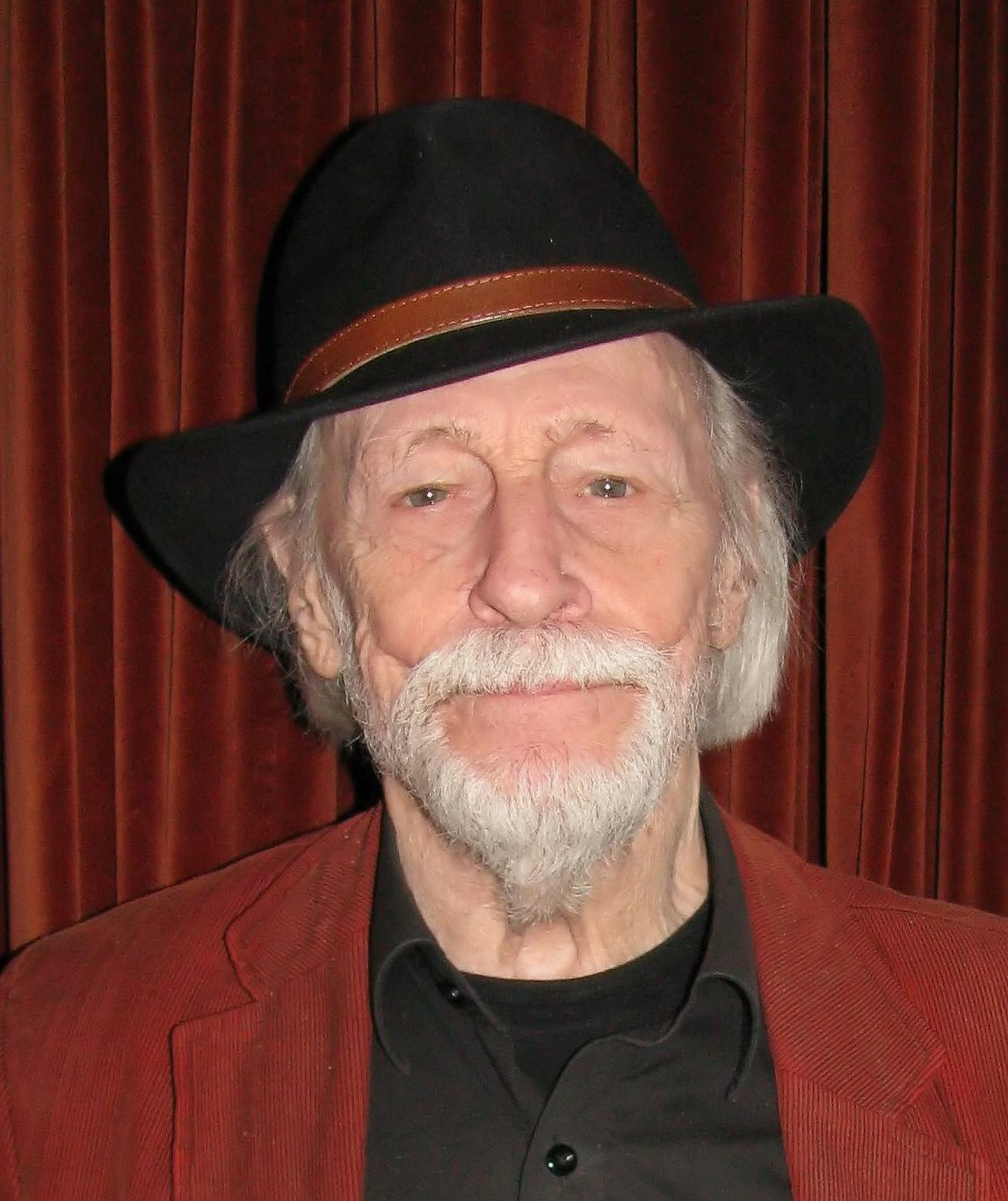
- Herman Pieter de Boer in November 2009.
- Born: Herman Pieter de Boer; 9 February 1928; Rotterdam, South Holland, Netherlands
- Died: 1 January 2014 (aged 85); Eindhoven, North Brabant, Netherlands
- Other name: Johnny Austerlitz
- Occupations: Writer, journalist, lyricist
- Years active: 1956–2014
- Spouses: Inge Frank; Judy van Osnabrugge
- Children: 4 (Marion de Boer, Nino de Boer, Waldemar de Boer, Sander de Boer)
- Website: http://www.hermanpieterdeboer.nl/ (in Dutch)

Herman Pieter de Boer (9 February 1928 – 1 January 2014), also known as Johnny Austerlitz, was a Dutch writer, journalist and lyricist, whose career spanned over 55 years.

Born in Rotterdam, South Holland, de Boer began his writing career in 1956 and wrote fifty novels.

Herman Pieter de Boer died following a long illness during the early hours of 1 January 2014, aged 85, in Eindhoven, North Brabant.
