= Wubbo de Boer =

Dutch civil servant (1948 – 2017)

Wubbo de Boer (born 27 May 1948, Amsterdam, died 20 April 2017) was a Dutch civil servant.

He has held several posts as Director General of Civil Aviation, and of Transport Policy in the Dutch Ministry of Transport. He was also Director General of Competition policy and also for Service Industry and Consumer Protection, as well as for Small and Medium Sized Enterprises in the Dutch Ministry of Economic Affairs. He was also president from 2000 to 2010 of the Office for Harmonization in the Internal Market (OHIM), the European Union body in charge of trademarks and designs and based in Alicante, Spain.

He was educated at the University of Amsterdam (1966–1971).
