= List of Dutch family names =

Dutch family names were not required until 1811 when emperor Napoleon annexed the Netherlands; prior to 1811, the use of patronymics was much more common.

In Dutch linguistics, many names use certain qualifying words (prepositions) which are positioned between a person's given name and their surname. Although these words, tussenvoegsels, are not strictly essential to state the person's surname, they are nevertheless a part of the surname and are almost always included for clarity. For example, someone whose family name is "De Vries" is not found at the letter "D" in the telephone directory but at "V"; the "de" is a tussenvoegsel and is not a part of the indexing process but rather is more of a stylistic qualifier. Another reason for this methodology is that it makes finding someone's name in a database relatively easy, since most Dutch prepositions start with the same letter (and thus if the prepositions led, there would be constant superfluous data entry to arrive at the desired name). In the Netherlands, the tussenvoegsel is written with a capital letter if no name precedes it. For example:

- a person with the name "Jan" as a given name and "de Vries" as a surname would be written Jan de Vries or "de heer De Vries", literally, Mr. De Vries.

See also the main Dutch surnames section.

== List of Dutch surnames ==
This random sampling of Dutch family names is sorted by family name, with the tussenvoegsel following the name after a comma. Meanings are provided where known. See Category:Dutch-language surnames and Category:Surnames of Frisian origin for surnames with their own pages.

- Baas – The Boss
- Bakker – Baker
- Beek, van – From the brook
- Beekhof – garden brook
- Beenhouwer – Butcher
- Berg, van der – From the cliff, mountain
- Berkenbosch – birch wood, a grove of birch trees
- Bijl, van der – "from the axe" – i.e. descended from woodcutters (lumberjacks)
- Boer, de – the Farmer
- Boogaard – from the orchard, Americanised as Bogart
- Boogman – Bowman, Archer
- Boor, van der; de Boor – possibly of the same French root as Boer – farmer or simple person; "boorish"
- Bos – Forest
- Bouwman – in modern Dutch it means building man (mason or construction worker), but in older Dutch it meant farmer
- Braam – Blackberry
- Brouwer – Brewer
- Bruin, de (Bruijn, de) – brown
- Buskirk, van – literally "bush church", or "church in the woods"
- Byl, van der – archaic spelling, Afrikaans, or Americanization of "van der Bijl"
- Carels - son of Carel
- Coevorden, van – e.g. George Vancouver#Origins of the family name
- Citroen – lemon, e.g. André Citroën
- Cornelissen – son of Cornelius
- Dekker – from the verb dekken or to cover as in covering roof tops (compare "Thatcher")
- Dijk, Deijck, van – From a dike
- Dijkstra – From a dyke
- Dijksma – Ano who lives by a dyke
- Dijkgraaf – dike grave or dike reeve: the one in charge of maintenance
- Elzinga
- Faber – from the Latin word smith
- Graaf, de – The count/earl
- Groot, de – The tall/great
- Groot – Tall (person)
- Haan, de – Rooster
- Haas, de – Hare
- Heide, van der – from the heath
- Hendriks, Hendriksen, Hendrix – Henry's son
- Heuvel, van den – From the hill, mound
- Hoek, van de – (corner, sandbar=cape) from the corner; Hoek van Holland as landscape term
- Hoff, van het – (servant) from the court
- Kleij, van der – (Kley, Cleij, Cley) Clay
- Klein, little, small
- Kneynsberg – Du: Kneijnsberg; kneijn = konijn: Rabbithill
- Koopman, Koopmans – Merchant
- Kuiper, Cuyper, Kuyper, de – the Cooper
- Lange – Tall (man)
- Lange, de, DeLange – the Tall (one)
- Leeuwen, van – From Leeuwen/Leuven; Levi
- Jaager, de – the Hunter
- Jansen, Janssen – Jan's son (compare Johnson)
- Jong, de – the Junior
- Koning, de(n) – the King
- Linden, van der – from the Linden (type of tree)
- Meijer, Meyer – Bailiff or steward
- Meer, van der – From the lake
- Mesman, mes – knife (maker), cutler
- Meulenbelt – artificial mill's hill
- Molen, van der – from the Mill
- Muis – Mouse
- Mulder, Molenaar – Miller
- Prins – Prince
- Ruis, Ruys, Ruisch, Ruysch – the sound of wind or water (surname common with millers).
- Rijnsburger – inhabitant of Rijnsburg
- Sittart, van – from Sittard, Anglicised as Vansittart
- Teulings
- Thyssen, Thysen – Du: Thijssen: Son of Thijs
- Timmerman – Carpenter
- Tuinstra – From the Garden
- Verstappen;-The name is a contraction of van der stappen, literally meaning "from/of the steps"
- Vegte, van der – From the Vechte
- Vinke – Little Bird
- Visser – Fisher
- Vliet, van – From the vliet (type of water)
- Vries, de Vries – The Frisian
- Vos – Fox
- Vroom – piously (borne by a 16th–17th century family of artists)
- Vuurst, van de(r) – From the Vuursche (Forest area in the middle of the Netherlands)
- Wees, de – The Orphan
- Wees, van – offsping of the Orphan
- Westhuizen, van der – from the houses located in the west
- Willems, Willemsen – William's son
- Windt, de – the Wind
- Wit, de – White (= the blond)
- Wolfswinkel, van – wolf's store/shop
- Zijl, van – from the waterway (Middle Dutch)
- Zutphen, van – (From Zutphen, city in the Netherlands)
