= Kleij =

Kleij, van der (Kley, Cleij, Cley) is a Dutch surname. Here "van der" is a tussenvoegsel; also, y is often used to replace the digraph ij. Notable people with the surname include:

- Eric van der Kleij, British entrepreneur
- Jos Kleij, real name of G.W. Sok (born 1957), Dutch singer
- Ton van der Kleij musician from the band Earth and Fire

== See also ==
- Klei
- Kley
- Cley (disambiguation)
