= Aalfs =

Aalfs is a surname. Notable people with the surname include:

- Gerrit Aalfs (1892–1970), Dutch teacher, filmmaker, and photographer
- Janet Aalfs (born 1956), American poet and martial artist, daughter of Joann
- Joann Aalfs (1923–2021), American women's rights and LGBTQ rights activist

== See also ==
- Ruijs-Aalfs syndrome
