= Klei (disambiguation) =

Klei or Klei Entertainment is a Canadian video game developer.

Klei may also refer to:

- KLEI
- Dorine van der Klei, Dutch singer, songwriter, photographer and journalist
- Gerrie van der Klei (born 1945), Dutch jazz singer, actress, and musician (classical guitar)

== See also ==
- Kleij
- Cley (disambiguation)
- Kleis
