= Bylina (disambiguation) =

Bylina is a type of East Slavic epic narrative poem.

Bylina may also refer to:

- Bylina (airline)
- Bylina, Pomeranian Voivodeship (north Poland)
- Bylina Overture by Vasily Kalinnikov
- Russian electronic warfare system
