= BYL =

BYL may refer to:

- BYL (airline), Moscow, Russia
- Barry Links railway station, Scotland, station code
- Byl (surname)
