= Ruijs =

Ruijs or Ruys is a Dutch patronymic surname, derived from the archaic Dutch given name Ruis. Variant forms are Ruijsch, Ruis, Ruisch and Ruysch. People with the surname include:

- Anna Charlotte Ruys (1898–1977), Dutch bacteriologist and epidemiologist
- Anthony Ruys (born 1947), Belgian-born Dutch business executive
- Charles Ruijs de Beerenbrouck (1873–1936), Dutch statesman, Prime Minister of the Netherlands 1918–25 and 1929–33
- Cor Ruys (1889–1952), Dutch actor, stage director and comedian
- Jos Ruijs (born 1955), Dutch rower
- Mien Ruys (1904–1999), Dutch landscape and garden architect
- Tiny Ruys (1957–2025), Dutch football coach
- Willem Ruis (1945–1986), Dutch game show host
- Willem Ruys (1894–1942) (1894–1942), Dutch director of shipowner Rotterdamsche Lloyd and executed resistance fighter in World War II
  - MS Willem Ruys, a Koninklijke Rotterdamsche Lloyd-owned passenger liner named after him; known for the hijacking incident under the later name Achille Lauro
- Willem Jan Danielsz Ruys (1809–1889), Dutch shipowner, whose family founded Rotterdamsche Lloyd

== See also ==
- Ruijs-Aalfs syndrome
- Ruys's bird-of-paradise, named after Theodoor Hilbert Ruys (1880–1942), Dutch merchant and missionary in northwest New Guinea
