= Hyperforeignism =

Type of linguistic hypercorrection

A hyperforeignism is a type of hypercorrection where speakers identify an inaccurate pattern in loanwords from a foreign language and then apply that pattern to other loanwords (either from the same language or a different one). This results in a pronunciation of those loanwords which does not reflect the rules of either language. For example, the ⟨n⟩ in habanero is pronounced as [n] in Spanish, but English-speakers sometimes pronounce it as /nj/, as if the word were spelled habañero.

Hyperforeignisms can manifest in a number of ways, including the application of the spelling or pronunciation rules of one language to a word borrowed from another.

Intentional hyperforeignisms can be used for comedic effect, such as pronouncing Report with a silent ⟨t⟩ in The Colbert Report or pronouncing Target as /tɑːrˈʒeɪ/ tar-ZHAY, as though it were an upscale boutique. This form of hyperforeignism is a way of poking fun at those who earnestly adopt foreign-sounding pronunciations of pseudo-loanwords.

== English ==
Examples:

- parmesan (from French [paʁməzɑ̃]), sometimes as /ˈpɑːrməʒɑːn/ in US English.
- Mandarin Chinese names like Beijing (with [tɕ], which sounds like [dʒ] to English speakers) with /ʒ/: /beɪˈʒɪŋ/.

=== French words ===
A number of words of French origin feature a final ⟨e⟩ that is pronounced in English but silent in the original language. For example, the noun cache is sometimes pronounced /kæʃeɪ/, as though it were spelled either ⟨cachet⟩ (meaning "seal" or "signature") or ⟨caché⟩ (meaning "hidden"). In French, the final ⟨e⟩ is silent and the word is pronounced [kaʃ]. The word cadre is sometimes pronounced /ˈkɑːdreɪ/ in English, as though it were of Spanish origin. In French, the final ⟨e⟩ is silent [kadʁ] and a common English pronunciation is /ˈkɑːdrə/.

Legal English is replete with words derived from Norman French, which for a long time was the language of the courts in England and Wales. The correct pronunciation of Norman French is often closer to a natural contemporary English reading than to modern French: the attempt to pronounce these phrases as if they were modern French could therefore be considered to be a hyperforeignism. For example, the clerk's summons "Oyez!" ("Attention!") is commonly pronounced ending in a consonant, /s/ or /z/.

A common pattern is pronouncing French loanwords without a word-final /r/, as with derrière, peignoir, and répertoire. This is actually permissible (especially in informal contexts) in French for words like quatre and fenêtre, where the /r/ follows a consonant, but not for words such as derrière, peignoir, and répertoire, where the /r/ follows a vowel and must be pronounced. For infinitives ending in /er/, such as aimer and parler, the /r/ is never pronounced. In Metropolitan French /r/ is optional as a word ending, whereas the vowel just in front of it is always long, contrasting with vowels being almost always short in word-ending positions.

Another common pattern, influenced by French morphophonology, is the omission of word-final consonants. Hyperforeign application of this tendency occurs with omission of these consonants in words with final consonants that are pronounced in French. This occurs notably in the term coup de grâce, in which some speakers omit the final consonant /s/, although it is pronounced in French as [ku də ɡʁɑs]; omitting this consonant instead sounds like coup de gras, meaning a nonsensical "blow of fat." Other examples of this include Vichyssoise.

Speakers of American English typically pronounce lingerie /ˌlɒndʒəˈreɪ/.

=== Hindi words ===
The ⟨j⟩ in the name of the Taj Mahal or raj is often rendered /ʒ/, but a closer approximation to the Hindi sound is /dʒ/.

=== Italian words ===
The ⟨g⟩ in Adagio may be realized as /ʒ/, even though the soft ⟨g⟩ of Italian represents an affricate [dʒ].

Patrizia Giampieri observed that many pseudo-English words can be found in Italian, such as autostop (hitch-hike) and flipper (pinball machine). Perception of English as a prestige language among some Italian speakers may explain the popularity of hyperforeign vocabulary items such as these.

=== Russian words ===
Because the Russian loanword dacha (дача [ˈdatɕə]) looks like it could be German, the pronunciation /ˈdɑːxə/, with a velar fricative, shows an attempt at marking a word as foreign, but with a sound not originally present in the source word.

=== Spanish words ===
The digraph ⟨ch⟩ of Spanish generally represents [tʃ], similar to English ⟨ch⟩. Hyperforeign realizations of many Spanish loanwords or proper names may substitute other sounds. Examples include a French-style [ʃ] in the surname Chávez and in Che Guevara, or a German-influenced [x] or Ancient Greek-influenced [k] in machismo. The ⟨z⟩ in the Spanish word chorizo is sometimes realized as /ts/ by English speakers, reflecting more closely the pronunciation of ⟨z⟩ and ⟨zz⟩ in Italian and Italian loanwords in English. This is not the pronunciation of present-day Spanish, however. Rather, the ⟨z⟩ in chorizo represents [θ] or [s] (depending on dialect) in Spanish. Also, the -‍es suffix in many other loanwords such as Angeles (Ángeles) is less usually pronounced in the United Kingdom and often Australia like ease (i.e., /ˈændʒɪliːz/ AN-jil-eez), hence Los Angeles (Los Ángeles) is also /lɒs ˈændʒɪliːz/. Phonetician Jack Windsor Lewis described the most common one, with eez, as a spelling pronunciation based on analogy with Greek words ending in -‍es, "reflecting a time when the classics were familiar if Spanish was not".

=== Swedish words ===
The Swedish word smorgasbord (smörgåsbord) is often pronounced by English speakers with a [ʃ] at the start instead of [s].

== Other languages ==
=== Malay and Indonesian ===
In Malay and Indonesian, some words of non-Arabic origin are mistakenly reanalysed as coming from Arabic and then respelt more similarly to Arabic loans, with some of these respelling forms sometimes even becoming standard. Some respellings of such kind include:

Hyperforeignisms in Malay and Indonesian
Malay/Indonesian word	Hyperforeign spelling	Etymology
beda 'difference'	beza (standard in Malay)	From Sanskrit bhēda
surga 'heaven'	syurga (standard in Malay)	From Sanskrit svarga
pihak 'side'	fihaq	Of Malayo-Polynesian origin (cognate with Iban piak 'side' and Hiligaynon pihak 'to cut in half')

=== Modern Greek ===
Several varieties of Greek, such as that spoken in Tyrnavos, may retain front rounded vowels in Turkish loanwords, e.g., dʒüdʒés 'dwarf,' from Turkish cüce.

=== Norwegian ===
In Norwegian, like in Swedish, entrecôte can be pronounced without the final [t]. This might also happen in pommes frites (french fries), and the [z] is often removed in the pronunciation of Béarnaise sauce.

=== Polish ===
Hyperforeignisms sometimes occur in Polish with English loanwords or names. One example would be the name Roosevelt, which is pronounced [ˈruzvɛlt], as if it started like ooze, even though a natural Dutch pronunciation would be closer to the English one.

Polish loanwords from Japanese are often subject to hyperforeignism. The names of three of the four main islands of Japan, Honsiu, Kiusiu, and Sikoku, are already Polish transcriptions with close approximations of Japanese sounds—[ˈxɔɲɕu], [ˈkʲuɕu], and [ɕiˈkɔku]—but are often pronounced with changing native /ɕ/ into foreign /sj/. Other Japanese words use English-based (Hepburn) transcriptions, which causes further problems.

Phenian, a now obsolete Polish name for Pyongyang, which was a transcription of Russian Пхеньян, is commonly pronounced [ˈfɛɲan], as if ⟨ph⟩ represented the voiceless labiodental fricative (/f/) like in words of Greek origin.

The letter c in the surname Arctowski makes the sound Polish pronunciation: [t͡s], but many people mispronounce it with Polish pronunciation: [k] because of the mistaken assumption the word is of English/Latin origin and derived from the term Arctic, while it actually comes from the German Artzt. When the name was transliterated into other languages that use different scripts, some languages follow the correct pronunciation (Russian Арцтовский, Ukrainian Арцтовський, Azeri Artstovski (this one uses Latin but nonetheless transliterated), Armenian Արցտովսկի, Chinese 阿茨托夫斯基 or 阿爾茨托夫斯基), others use the faux-English pronunciation (Egyptian Arabic اركتوسكى, Standard Arabic أركتوسكي, Tamil ஆர்க்டோவ்சுகி), while some use a yet another mispronunciation (Japanese アルツトウスキー, which contains the correct Polish pronunciation: [t͡s] sound but includes the incorrectly anglicized ending with ow pronounced as /oʊ/ in place of Polish pronunciation: [ɔf] and the very English-style lengthened /iː/.) An important note is that the /k/ mistransliteration is not caused by the lack of the phoneme Polish pronunciation: [t͡s] in certain languages – in other loanwords with Polish pronunciation: [t͡s], either a combination of Polish pronunciation: [t] and Polish pronunciation: [s] letters or a "flattening" to a plain Polish pronunciation: [s] would be expected, not the Polish pronunciation: [k] sound which is relatively far off and completely unjustified.

== See also ==
- Metal umlaut
