= Braam =

Braam or van Braam is a Dutch surname, here "van" is a tussenvoegsel (family name affix). "Baam" is also a given name, a variant of Bram (Abraham).

== Given name ==
- Braam Els, South African rugby union player
- Braam Jordaan, South African author and film producer
- Braam Reyneke, South African rugby union player
- Braam van Straaten, South African rugby union footballer
- Braam Steyn, Italy international rugby union player
- Braam du Toit, South African composer

== Surname ==
- Aegidius van Braam, Dutch Navy admiral
- Andreas Everardus van Braam Houckgeest, Dutch-American merchant
- Danique Braam (born 1995), Dutch cyclist
- Jacob Andries van Braam (1771–1820), Dutch chief merchant
- Jacob Pieter van Braam (1737–1803), Dutch States Navy officer
- Jacob Van Braam, Dutch mercenary; military trainer and interpreter to George Washington
- Michiel Braam, Dutch jazz pianist and composer
- Peter Braam, Dutch-American computer scientist
