= Bijl =

Bijl or Byl is a Dutch surname. "Bijl" means "axe" in Dutch, and the name may be a metonymic occupational surname referring to a butcher or lumberjack. It can also be of Matronymic origin, referring to a short form of Sibylla. People with this surname include:

- Arie Bijl (1908–1945), Dutch physicist
- Glenn Bijl (born 1995), Dutch footballer
- Guillaume Bijl (1946–2025), Belgian conceptual and installation artist
- Jeroen Bijl (born 1966), Dutch volleyballplayer and chef de mission of NOC NSF
- Lyn Byl (born 1979), German-British handball player
- Marc Bijl (born 1970), Dutch performance and installation artist
- Martine Bijl (1948–2019), Dutch singer, actress, writer and television presenter
- Nelly Byl (1919–2011), Belgian songwriter

== See also ==
- Van der Bijl
- Van der Byl
