= Verstappen (surname) =

Verstappen is a Dutch toponymic surname. The name is a contraction of van der stappen, literally meaning "from/of the steps". Notable people with the surname include:

- Alessia Verstappen (born 2006), Belgian rhythmic gymnast
- Annemarie Verstappen (born 1965), Dutch swimmer
- Eric Verstappen (born 1994), Dutch footballer
- Jos Verstappen (born 1972), Dutch racing driver
- Max Verstappen (born 1997), Dutch racing driver, son of Jos Verstappen and 4-time Formula One World Champion (2021, 2022, 2023, 2024)
- Max Verstappen (puppetteer) (born 1957) Dutch ventriloquist
- Nicky Verstappen (1987–1998), Dutch victim of homicide
- Wim Verstappen (1937–2004), Dutch film and television director and producer

The original variant, van der Stappen, is also a Dutch surname. At least one notable person is known to have borne the surname:

- Charles van der Stappen (1843–1910), Belgian sculptor

== See also ==
- 12630 Verstappen, main-belt asteroid named after astronomer René Verstappen
- Verstappen v Port Edward Town Board, a 1993 South African legal case
- Vanderstappen
