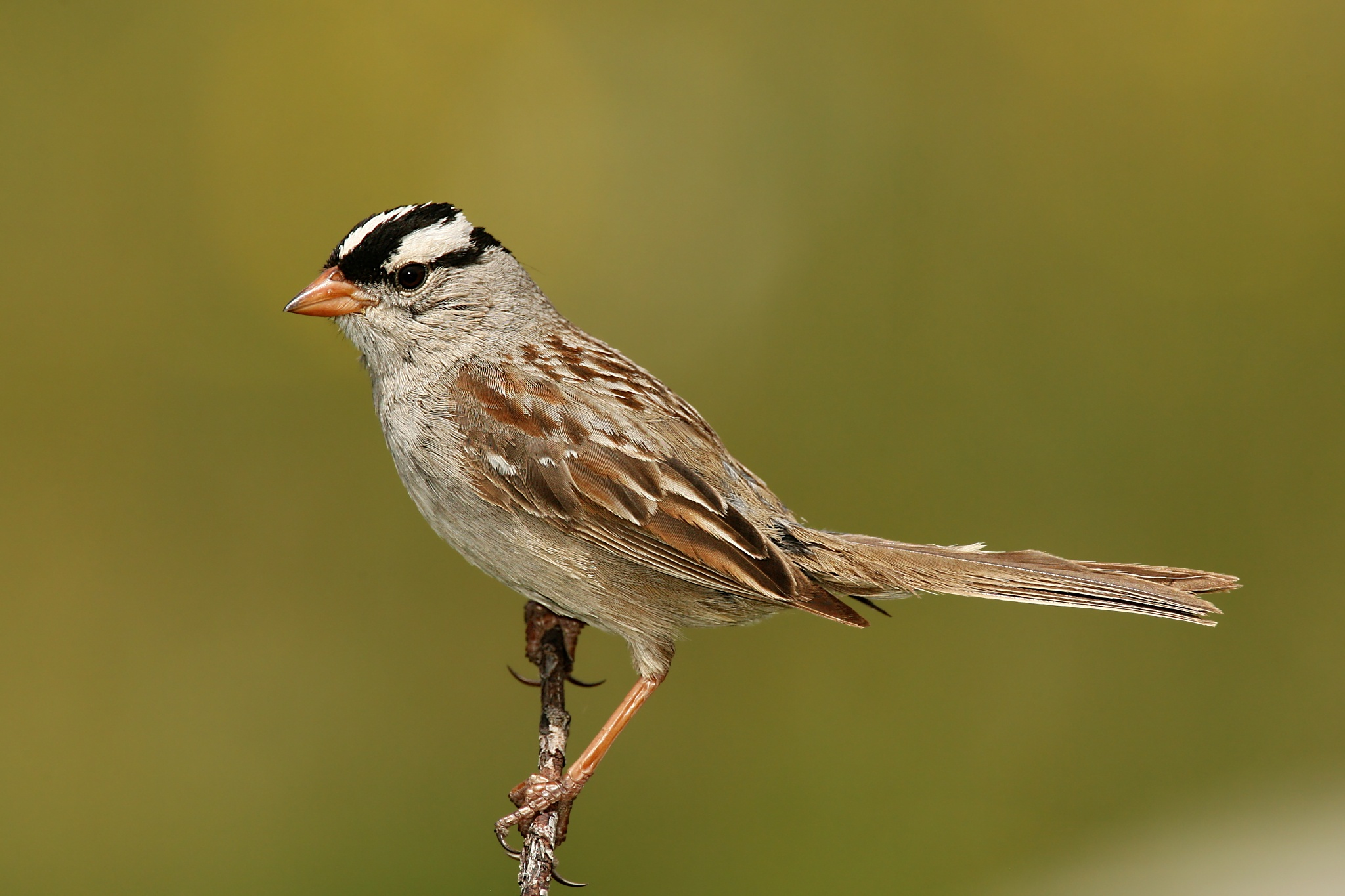

Conservation status
- Least Concern (IUCN 3.1)

Scientific classification
- Kingdom: Animalia
- Phylum: Chordata
- Class: Aves
- Order: Passeriformes
- Family: Passerellidae
- Genus: Zonotrichia
- Species: Z. leucophrys

Binomial name
- Zonotrichia leucophrys (Forster, 1772)
- Range of Z. leucophrys Breeding Migration Year-round Nonbreeding

= White-crowned sparrow =

White-crowned sparrow Temporal range: Late Pleistocene–present

Species of bird

The white-crowned sparrow (Zonotrichia leucophrys) is a species of passerine bird native to North America. A medium-sized member of the New World sparrow family, this species is marked by a grey face and black and white streaking on the upper head. It breeds in brushy areas in the taiga and tundra of the northernmost parts of the continent and in the Rocky Mountains and Pacific coast. While southerly populations in the Rocky Mountains and coast are largely resident, the breeding populations of the northerly part of its range are migratory and can be found as wintering or passage visitors through most of North America south to central Mexico.

== Etymology ==
The scientific name is from Ancient Greek. The genus name Zonotrichia is from Ancient Greek ζώνη (zone, transl. band) and θρίξ (thrix, transl. hair). The species name leucophrys is from λευκός (leukos, transl. white) and ὀφρῡ́ς (ophrus, transl. eyebrow).

== Description ==
Adults have black and white stripes on their head, a gray face, brown streaked upper parts and a long tail. The wings are brown with bars and the underparts are gray. Their bill is pink or yellow. Juveniles have rusty-brown, tan, or auburn-brown stripes alternating with grayish or buff stripes on the head. White-crowned sparrows are similar in appearance to the white-throated sparrow, but do not have the white throat markings or yellow lores.

Measurements:

- Length: 5.9–6.3 in (15–16 cm)
- Weight: 0.9–1.0 oz (25–28 g)
- Wingspan: 8.3–9.4 in (21–24 cm)

== Subspecies ==
There are five currently recognized subspecies of white-crowned sparrow (pugetensis, gambelii, nuttalli, oriantha, and leucophrys), varying in breeding distribution migratory route. Birds of the subspecies nuttalli are permanent residents in California, while birds of the subspecies gambelli may migrate as far as the Arctic Circle during the summer breeding season. Northern birds migrate to the southern United States and northern Mexico.

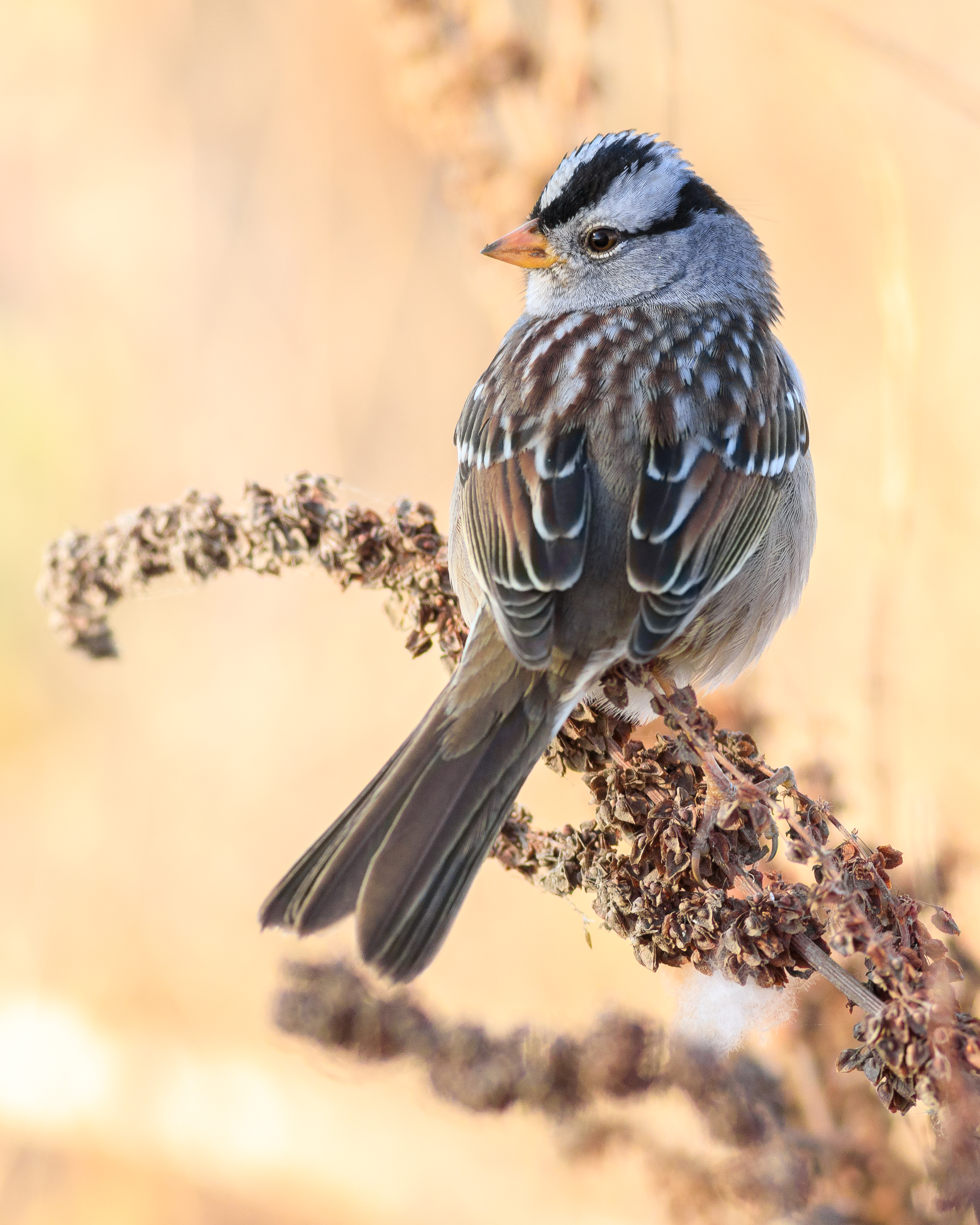
Z. l. gambelli
California, United States

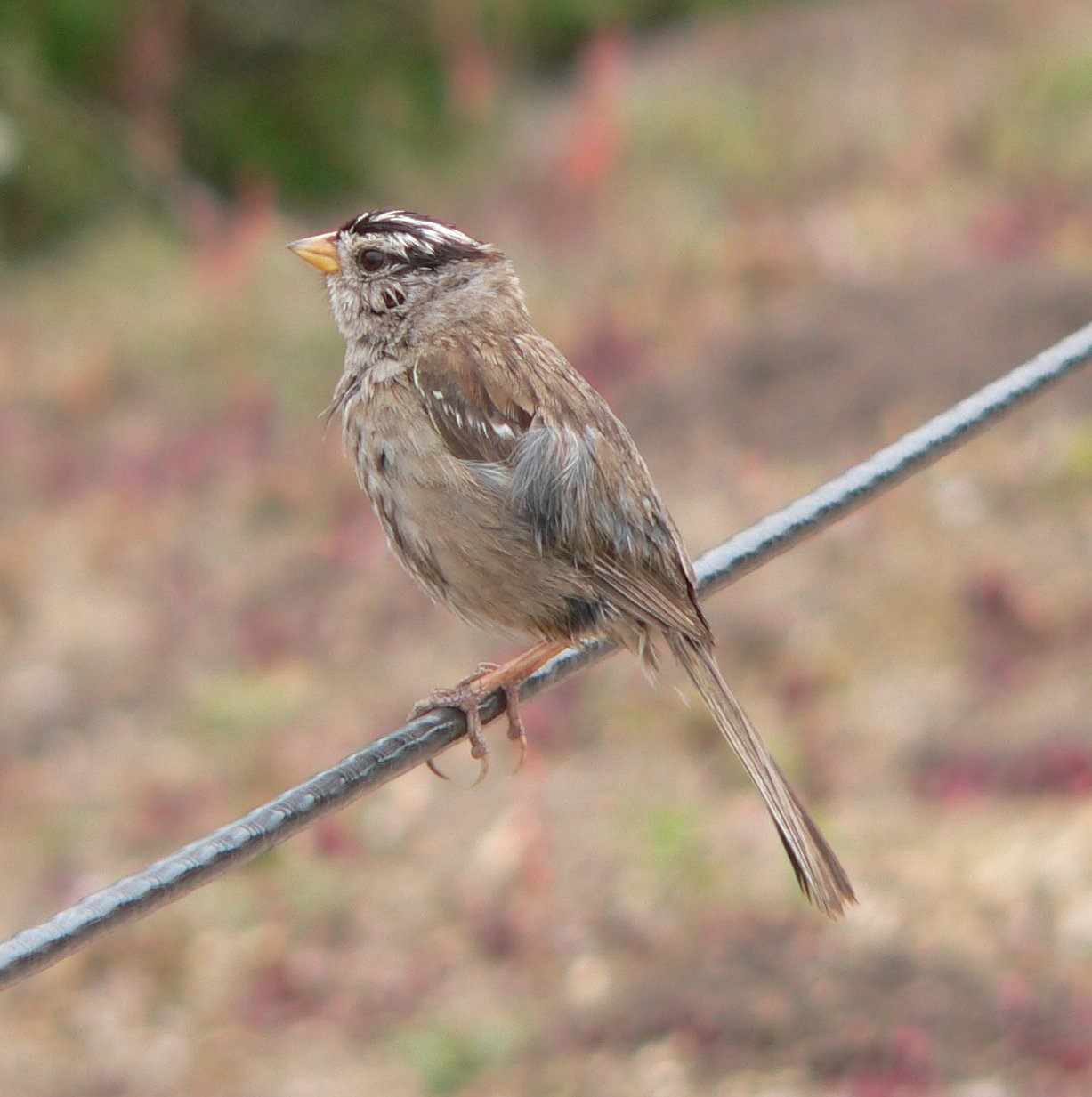
Z. l. nuttalli
Point Lobos State Reserve, California

Z. l. oriantha
Yoho National Park, BC, Canada

== Distribution ==
Their breeding habitat is open or bushy areas across northern Canada and the western United States, including tundra, high alpine meadows, and forest edges. Thickets, weedy fields, agricultural areas, roadsides, and backyards are important habitat to these birds during migration and over the winter.

The white-crowned sparrow is a very rare vagrant to western Europe. It has been sighted in England, Scotland, Ireland, and Norway. In 2008 a white-crowned sparrow was spotted in Cley next the Sea in Norfolk, England. To commemorate the event an image of the bird was included in a window at St Margaret's Church.

== Behaviour ==
These birds forage on the ground or in low vegetation, but sometimes make short flights to catch flying insects. They mainly eat seeds, other plant parts and insects. In winter, they often forage in flocks.

White-crowned sparrows nest either low in bushes or on the ground under shrubs and lay three to five brown-marked gray or greenish-blue eggs.

The white-crowned sparrow is known for its unihemispheric slow-wave sleep, which allows it to stay half-awake for up to two weeks during migration. This effect has been studied for possible human alertness applications in shift work and truck driving.

Recent studies by ornithologists including Elizabeth Derryberry have shown that white-crowned sparrow songs are affected by human activity and noise.

== Images ==
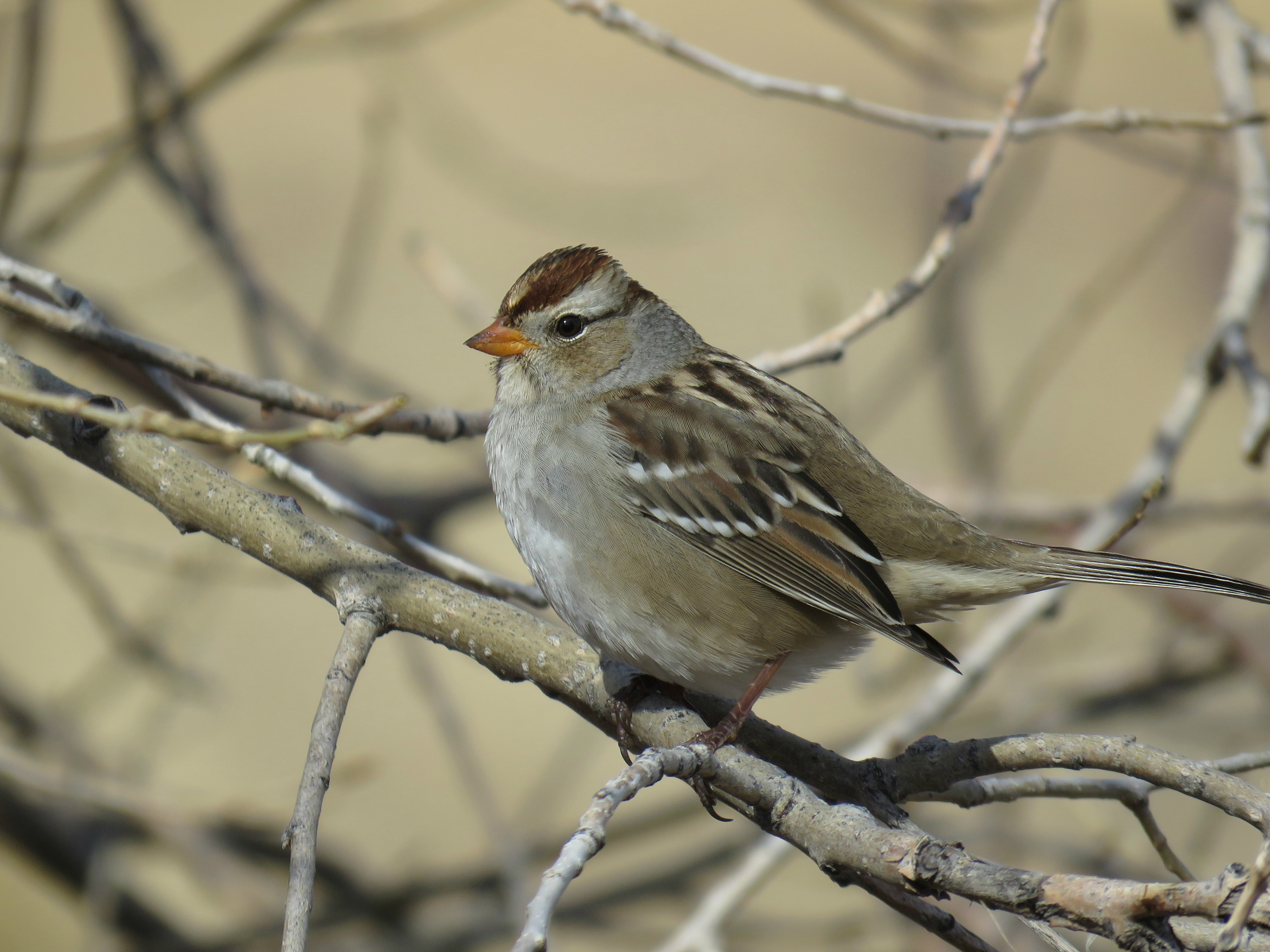
Immature white-crowned sparrows have more muted plumage.

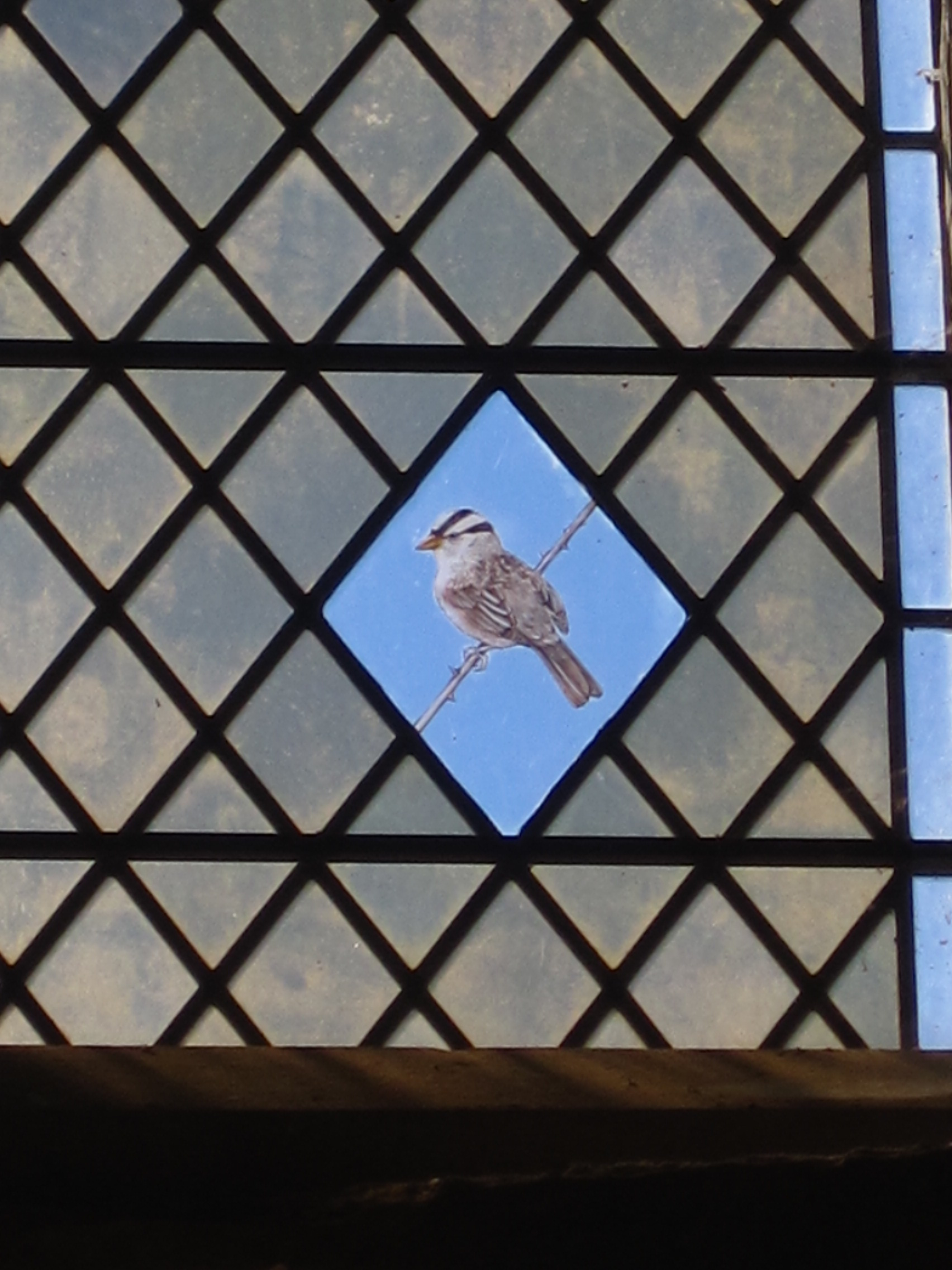
Depiction of a white-crowned sparrow in window in St Margaret's Church, Cley next the Sea, Norfolk
