= Vanderstappen =

Vanderstappen is a surname. Notable people with this surname include:

- André Vanderstappen (1934–2005), Belgian footballer
- Charles Vanderstappen (1884–1962), Belgian footballer
- Gustave Vanderstappen (1882–1955), Belgian footballer
- Jacques Vanderstappen (1930–2016), Belgian field hockey player
- Lance Vanderstappen (c. 1981 – 2006), member of the white supremacist prison gang the Soldiers of Aryan Culture and inmate at ADX Florence

== See also ==
- Verstappen (surname)
