= Elizabeth Derryberry =

American ornithologist

- Citizenship: United States
- Education: Duke University, Princeton University
- Scientific career
- Fields: Ornithology
- Workplaces: University of Tennessee, Tulane University
- Thesis: Song Evolution in White-Crowned Sparrows (Zonotrichia leucophrys): Patterns and Mechanisms (2007)
- Doctoral advisor: Steve Nowicki
- Website: derryberrylab.wordpress.com

Dr. Elizabeth Derryberry is an associate professor specializing in ornithology, in the Department of Neurobiology and Behavior in the College of Arts and Sciences at Cornell University and is the director of the Macaulay Library at the Cornell Lab of Ornithology.

== Education ==
Derryberry received her Bachelor of Arts in 2000 from Princeton University. Her major was ecology and evolutionary biology. The title of her undergraduate thesis was "An investigation of the effects of two haematozoa on reproductive success in mountain white-crowned sparrows."

She worked with Steve Nowicki at Duke University, graduating with a PhD in biology in 2007. Her doctoral thesis was entitled, Song Evolution in White-Crowned Sparrows (Zonotrichia leucophrys): Patterns and Mechanisms.

== Career ==
After completing her doctoral thesis, Derryberry began a postdoctoral position in 2007 at the Museum of Natural Science at Louisiana State University where she to studied lineage diversification in Neotropical ovenbirds and woodcreepers.

In 2012, Derryberry was hired as the Ken and Ruth Arnold Early Career assistant professor at Tulane University in the Ecology and Evolutionary Biology Department.

The Derryberry laboratory moved to the University of Tennessee's Department of Ecology and Environmental Biology in 2017.

In addition to her academic appointments, Derryberry served as an associate editor at the Journal of Animal Ecology from 2015 to 2018 and was an associate editor for Evolution from 2016 to 2019.

== Research ==
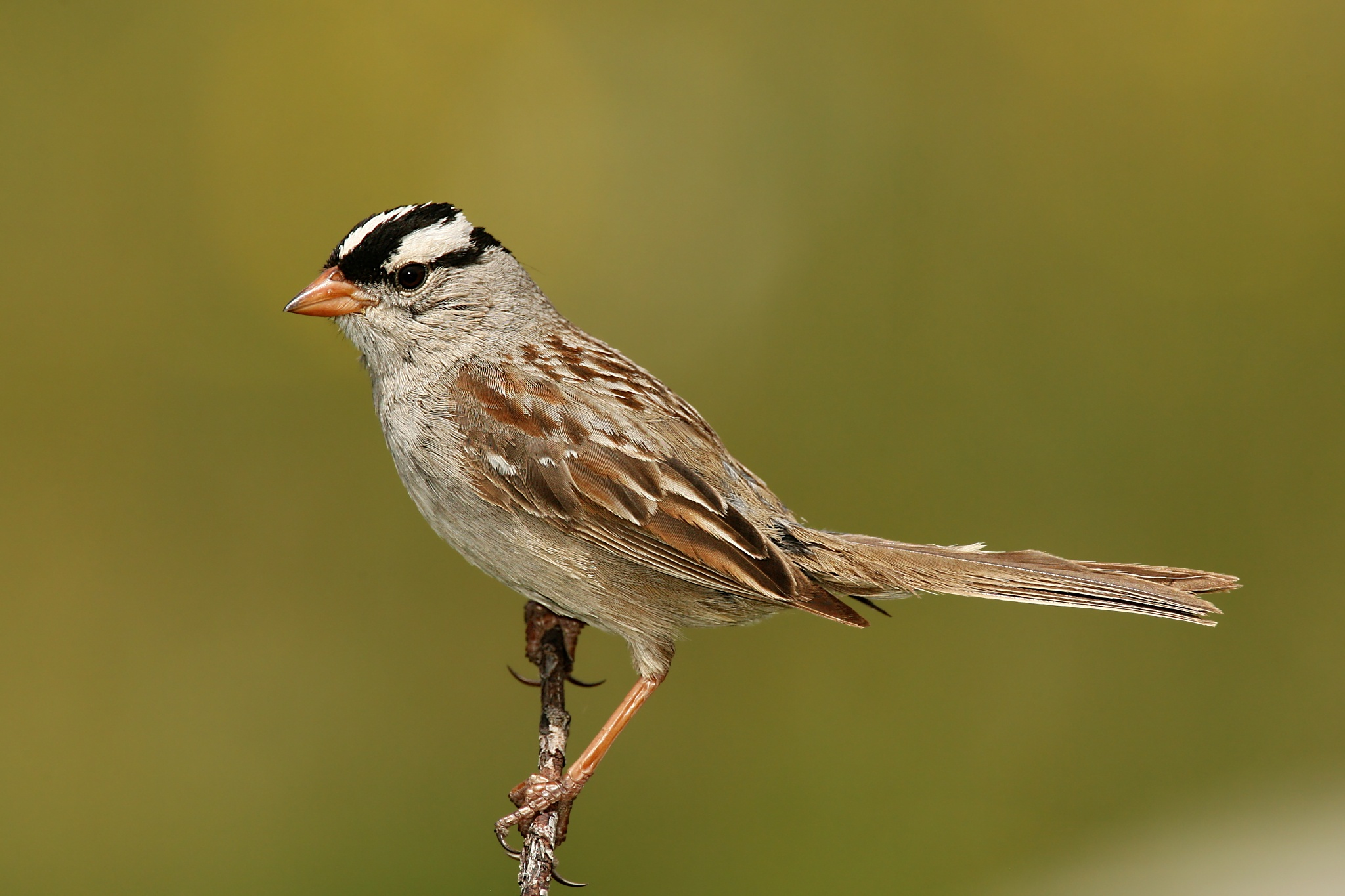
The white-crowned sparrow is the model organism Derryberry uses in her research.

Derryberry centers her studies of phylogenetics and signal evolution on the white-crowned sparrow (Zonotrichia leucophrys). She focuses her research program on determining how the environment affects sensory and signaling systems, and bird song in particular, and how those signaling systems affect competition for a mate and choice of a mate. Climate change and human influence on the environment are two factors that Derryberry studies in connection to the evolution of bird song.

During the COVID-19 pandemic, Derryberry analyzed white-crowned sparrows near the Golden Gate Bridge in San Francisco California. In response to the decreased traffic sounds, birds called twice as softly but the song traveled four times farther than in normal, pre-shutdown traffic. This work highlights Derryberry's efforts to understand the influence of urban environments on bird communication.

To investigate rates of evolution and factors contributing to avian diversity, Derryberry studies the suboscine (Tyranni), a group of tropical birds. This work focuses on the process of species formation and how rates of evolution are affected by environmental, climatic, and species interactions factors.

Derryberry also expanded her work to include Ovenbirds (Furnariidae), while still staying true to her expertise in bird song. In her 2018 study titled, "Ecological drivers of song evolution in birds: Disentangling the effects of habitat and morphology" she focuses on indirect (habitat-related) and direct (morphology-related) selection on mating calls. Derryberry concluded that phenotypic traits are more influential in the bird song of a species, as opposed to their environmental habitat.

== Awards and recognition ==
- Tulane School of Science and Engineering - Graduate Faculty Award for Excellence in Graduate Teaching and Mentorship (2016)
- American Ornithologists Union Council and Committee Member (2015-2018)
- NSF - IOS - Award in the Animal Behavior Cluster (2014-2017)
- HHMI - National Academy Education Fellow (2011)
- American Ornithologists Union - Research Grant Bleitz Award (2004)
- Gregory T. Pope - '80 Prize for Science Writing (2000)

== Outreach ==
Members of the Derryberry lab are committed to STEM outreach, participating in events that educate children about the natural world and science. Derryberry and her students have been involved in programs such as Kids U at the University of Tennessee, Fossil Fest at the McClung Museum of Natural History and Culture, and Expanding Your Horizons with Techbridge Girls. She also led workshops for Girls in STEM while a professor at Tulane University.
