= St Margaret's, Cley =

St Margaret's
- St Margaret's Church, Cley next the Sea
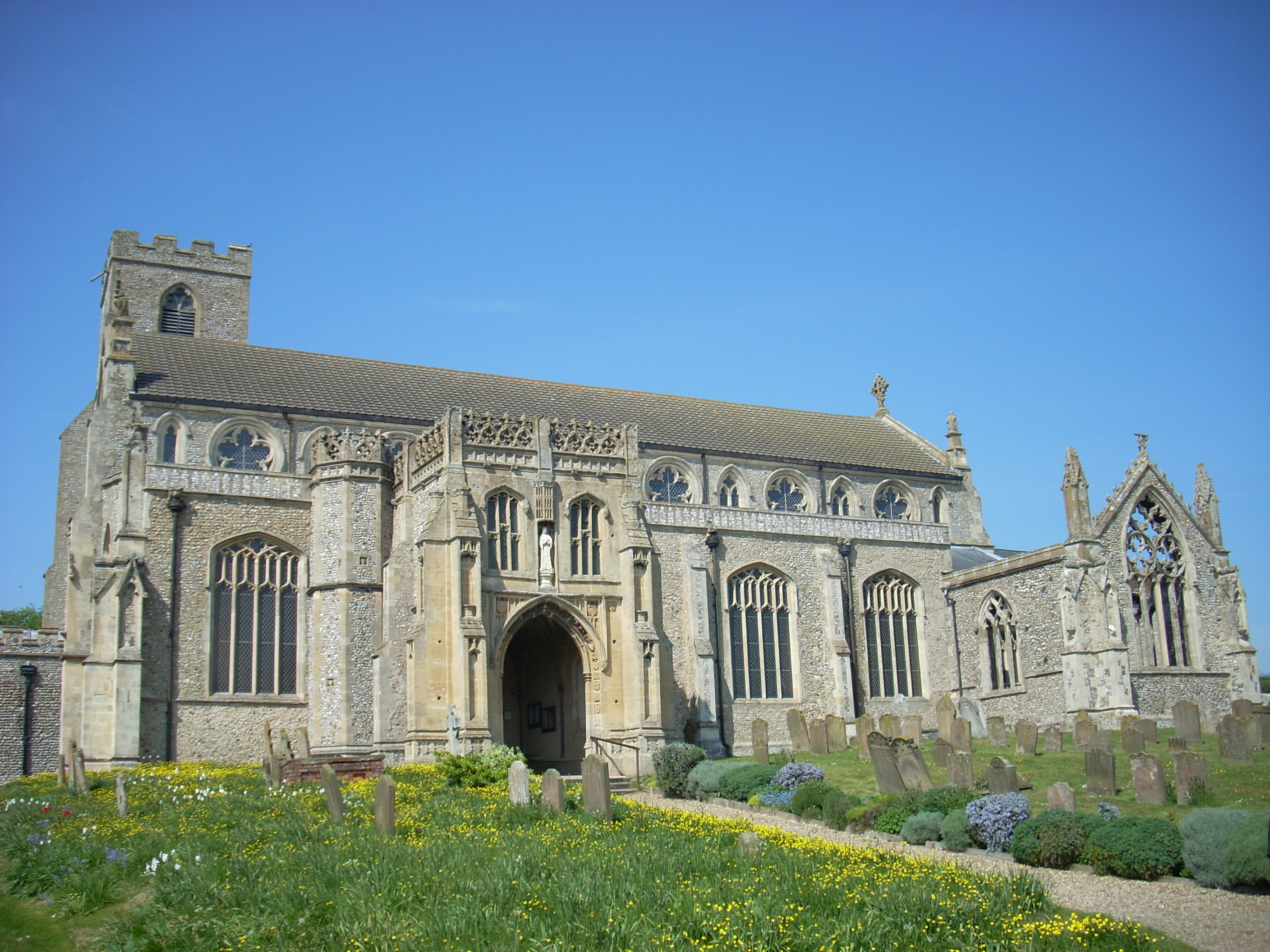

- Location within Norfolk
- 52°56′47″N 1°02′51″E
- OS grid reference: TG 04850 43130
- Location: Cley next the Sea Norfolk
- Country: England
- Denomination: Church of England

History
- Status: Parish church

Architecture
- Functional status: Active
- Heritage designation: Grade I listed

Administration
- Province: Canterbury
- Diocese: Norwich
- Archdeaconry: Lynn
- Deanery: Holt
- Parish: Cley

St Margaret's is the Anglican parish church of Cley next the Sea, Norfolk, in the deanery of Holt, the Archdeaconry of Lynn and the Diocese of Norwich. The dedication is to St Margaret of Antioch. It is the largest church in the Blakeney Haven area, with a nave to match, and was rebuilt from the 1320s to the mid-1340s. Before the end of the 14th century, a large south porch was added. The north and south transepts are derelict. The style is mainly Perpendicular, with some Decorated, and an early English style chancel.

It has an octagonal font, carved wooden bench ends and Decorated tracery, and a carved rood screen. St Margaret's is a nationally important building, with a Grade I listing for its exceptional architectural interest.

The church has a large number of war memorials.

== White-crowned sparrow ==
In 2008 a white-crowned sparrow, an American bird not usually seen in the United Kingdom, was spotted in Cley. Visiting birders donated more than £6,000 to a collection for the church's restoration. To commemorate the event an image of the bird was included in a window at St Margaret's.

== Gallery ==
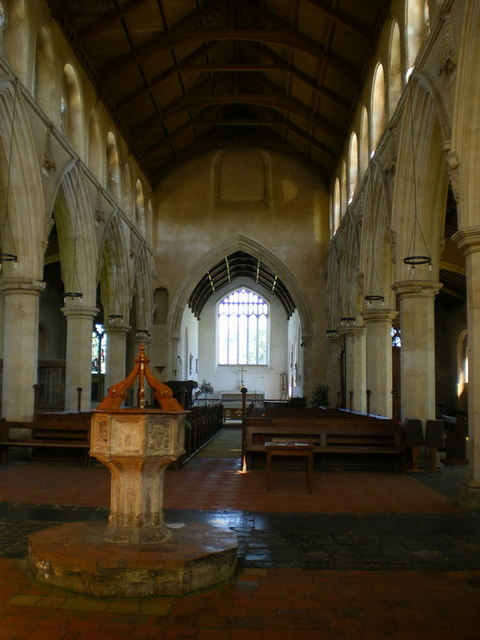
The font and nave, looking towards the chancel

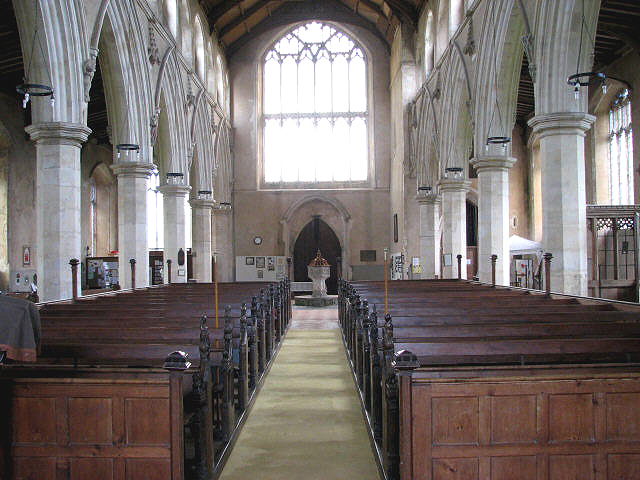
Nave, looking towards the font and the west door

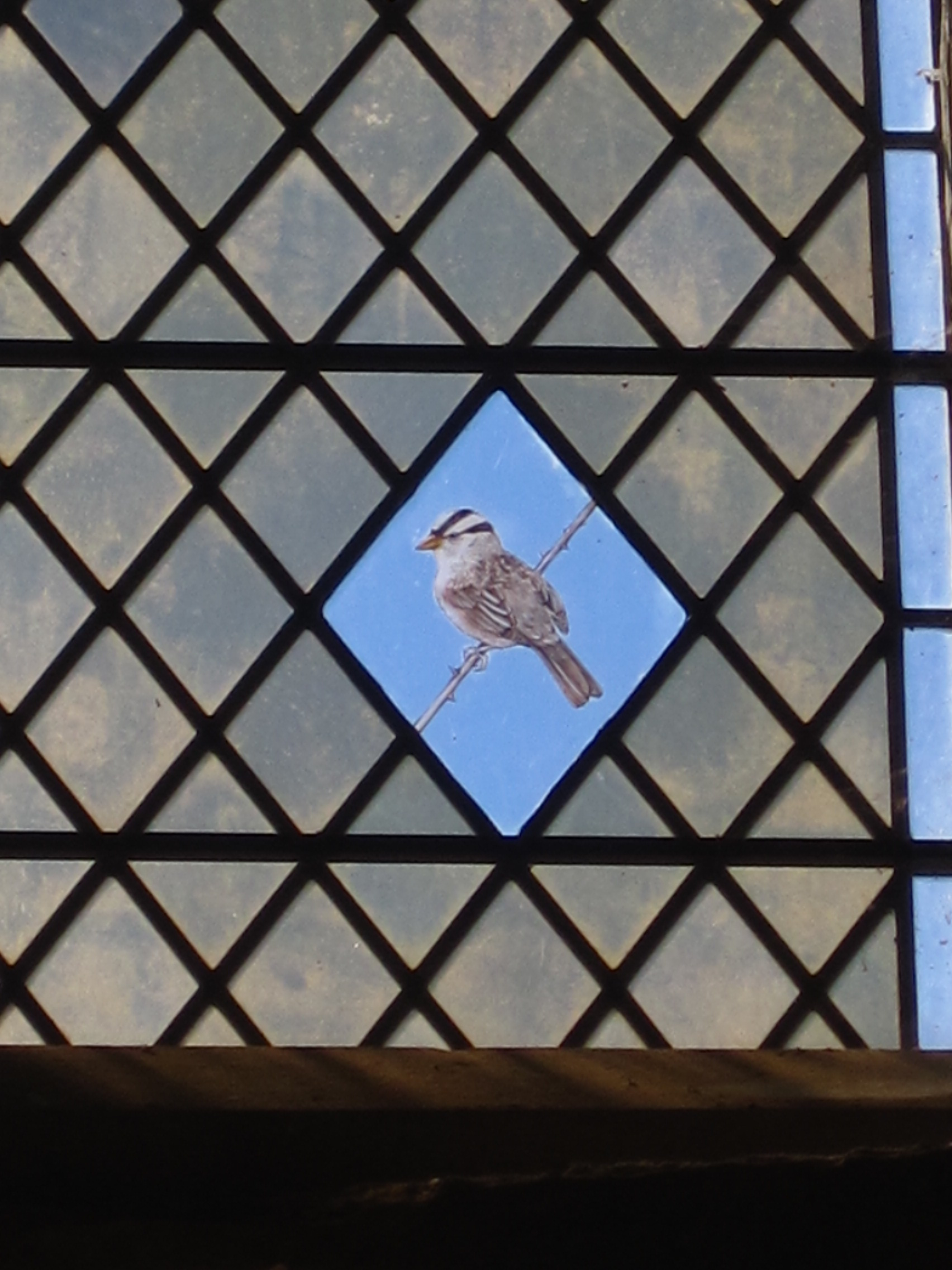
Depiction of a white-crowned sparrow in window in St Margaret's
