= Buskirk =

Buskirk is a surname of Dutch origin. Notable people with the surname include:

== People ==
- Bessie Buskirk (1892–1952), American actress
- Chris Buskirk (born 1968 or 1969), American conservative writer and businessman
- Clarence A. Buskirk (1842–1926), Indiana Attorney General (1874–1878) and promoter of Christian Science
- Elsworth R. Buskirk (1925–2010), American environmental and exercise physiologist
- George A. Buskirk, American lawyer, politician, and businessman
- Mary Balzer Buskirk, American fiber artist
- Ruth Buskirk, professor at the University of Texas at Austin
- Samuel Hamilton Buskirk (1820–1879), American lawyer, politician and justice of the Indiana Supreme Court

== Fictional characters ==
- Kuzzey Buskirk, a fictional character in the anime Gundam SEED

== Places ==
- Buskirk, Kentucky, small town in rural Pike County, Kentucky
- Buskirk, Kentucky former name of Thelma, Kentucky, unincorporated community in Johnson County
- Buskirk Bluffs, East Antarctica
- Buskirk Bridge, wooden covered bridge, in Buskirk hamlet in the town of Hoosick, New York State
- Buskirk-Chumley Theater
