= MUIS =

MUIS is an abbreviation for:

- Majlis Ugama Islam Singapura
- Mongol Ulsyn Ikh Surguuli, The National University of Mongolia

== See also ==
- Muis
