= SPRTN =

Protein found in humans

Identifiers
- Aliases: SPRTN, C1orf124, DDDL1880, DVC1, PRO4323, Spartan, dJ876B10.3, SprT-like N-terminal domain
- External IDs: OMIM: 616086; MGI: 2685351; GeneCards: SPRTN
Available structures
PDB	Ortholog search: PDBe RCSB
PDB	List of PDB id codes 5IY4

Gene location (Human)
Chr.	Chromosome 1 (human)
Band	1q42.2	Start	231,337,104 bp
Band	1q42.2	End	231,355,023 bp

Gene location (Mouse)
Chr.	Chromosome 8 (mouse)
Band	8|8 E2	Start	125,624,625 bp
Band	8|8 E2	End	125,632,900 bp
RNA expression pattern
Bgee	Human / Mouse (ortholog); Top expressed in: oocyte; secondary oocyte; gonad; Achilles tendon; stromal cell of endometrium; gastrocnemius muscle; testicle; muscle of thigh; islet of Langerhans; ventricular zone / Top expressed in: spermatocyte; seminiferous tubule; secondary oocyte; primary oocyte; spermatid; renal corpuscle; medullary collecting duct; zygote; condyle; conjunctival fornix; More reference expression data
BioGPS	n/a
Gene ontology
Molecular function	DNA binding; K63-linked polyubiquitin modification-dependent protein binding; protein binding; ubiquitin binding; metal ion binding
Cellular component	nuclear speck; nucleus; nucleoplasm; chromosome
Biological process	error-free translesion synthesis; positive regulation of protein ubiquitination; response to UV; cellular response to DNA damage stimulus; translesion synthesis; DNA repair
Sources:Amigo / QuickGO
Orthologs
Databases	NCBI: entry; OMA: entry
Species	Human	Mouse
Entrez	83932	244666
Ensembl	ENSG00000010072	ENSMUSG00000031986
UniProt	Q9H040	G3X912
RefSeq (mRNA)	NM_001010984; NM_001261462; NM_032018	NM_001111141
RefSeq (protein)	NP_001010984; NP_001248391; NP_114407	NP_001104611
Location (UCSC)	Chr 1: 231.34 – 231.36 Mb	Chr 8: 125.62 – 125.63 Mb
PubMed search
- Wikidata
View/Edit Human	View/Edit Mouse

Spartan (SPRTN) is a protein that in humans is encoded by the SPRTN gene. It is involved in DNA repair. Mutations in the SPRTN gene Ruijs–Aalfs syndrome is an autosomal recessive genetic disorder. Characteristics of this disorder are features of premature aging, chromosome instability and development of hepatocellular carcinoma. Ruijs–Aalfs syndrome arises as a result of mutations in the SPRTN gene that encodes a metalloproteinase employed in the repair of protein-linked DNA breaks.

SPRTN stands for SprT-domain at the N terminus, and the name comes from the E. coli gene SprT (stationary phase regulated). The gene SprT was named in 1996 by Dr. Ryutaro Utsumi, whose team identified the gene while searching for regulators of the bolA1 transcriptional regulator in the stationary phase.
