= Dijkgraaf =

Dijkgraaf (Dutch - dyke count) may refer to:

== People ==
- Elbert Dijkgraaf (born 1970), Dutch economist and politician
- Robbert Dijkgraaf (born 1960), Dutch mathematical physicist and string theorist

== Other uses ==
- Dijkgraaf (official), the head of a Dutch water board
- Dijkgraaf, Gelderland, a waterway in Gelderland, Netherlands
- Dijkgraafplein, a square in Amsterdam-Osdorp, Netherlands
