= Cley (disambiguation) =

Cley or Cley next the Sea is a village and civil parish on the River Glaven in the English county of Norfolk.

Cley may also refer to:

== Surname ==
- Jhon Cley (born 1994), Brazilian footballer
- Nicholas Cley, Member of the Parliament of England

== Other ==
- Cley Hall
- Cley Hill
- Cley Marshes

== See also ==
- Cockley Cley
