= Windt =

Windt is a German and Dutch surname.

== Geographical distribution ==
As of 2014, 33.2% of all known bearers of the surname Windt were residents of Germany (frequency 1:71,441), 20.2% of the United States (1:528,918), 16.6% of South Africa (1:96,211), 16.4% of the Netherlands (1:30,417), 2.0% of Hungary (1:144,359) and 1.2% of Australia (1:566,045), 1.2% of Austria (1:207,667), 1.1% of Canada (1:968,369), 1.1% of Brazil (1:5,527,357), 1.0% of Sweden (1:289,611) and 1.0% of Romania (1:608,420).

In Germany, the frequency of the surname was higher than national average (1:71,441) in the following states:

1. Bremen (1:12,201)
2. Hamburg (1:22,923)
3. Lower Saxony (1:29,509)
4. Saxony-Anhalt (1:33,284)
5. Schleswig-Holstein (1:60,962)
6. Hesse (1:62,357)
7. North Rhine-Westphalia (1:62,443)

In the Netherlands, the frequency of the surname was higher than national average (1:30,417) in the following provinces:

1. Groningen (1:6,174)
2. North Holland (1:15,924)
3. Flevoland (1:16,656)
4. Drenthe (1:20,150)
5. Gelderland (1:28,367)

== People ==
- Jacob van der Windt (1745–1792), Dutch skipper
- Harry de Windt (1856–1933), French travel writer
- Henny van der Windt (born 1955), Dutch ecologist
- Herbert Windt (1894–1965), German composer
- Katja Windt (born 1969), German mechanical engineer
- Peter Windt (born 1973), Dutch field hockey player
- Pierre de Windt (born 1983), Aruban athlete
- Kramies Windt (born 1974), American music, composer, songwriter
