= Wees =

Wees may refer to:

== People ==
- Frances Shelley Wees (1902–1982), American-Canadian educator and writer
- Gerrit van Wees (1913–1995), Dutch cyclist
- Wil van Wees (born 1942), Dutch speed skater
- Zoe Wees, German singer-songwriter

== Places ==
- Wees, Schleswig-Holstein, Germany
- Wees Historic District, United States

== Other ==
- WEES-LP, radio station
