= Jacob van der Windt =

Dutch sailor

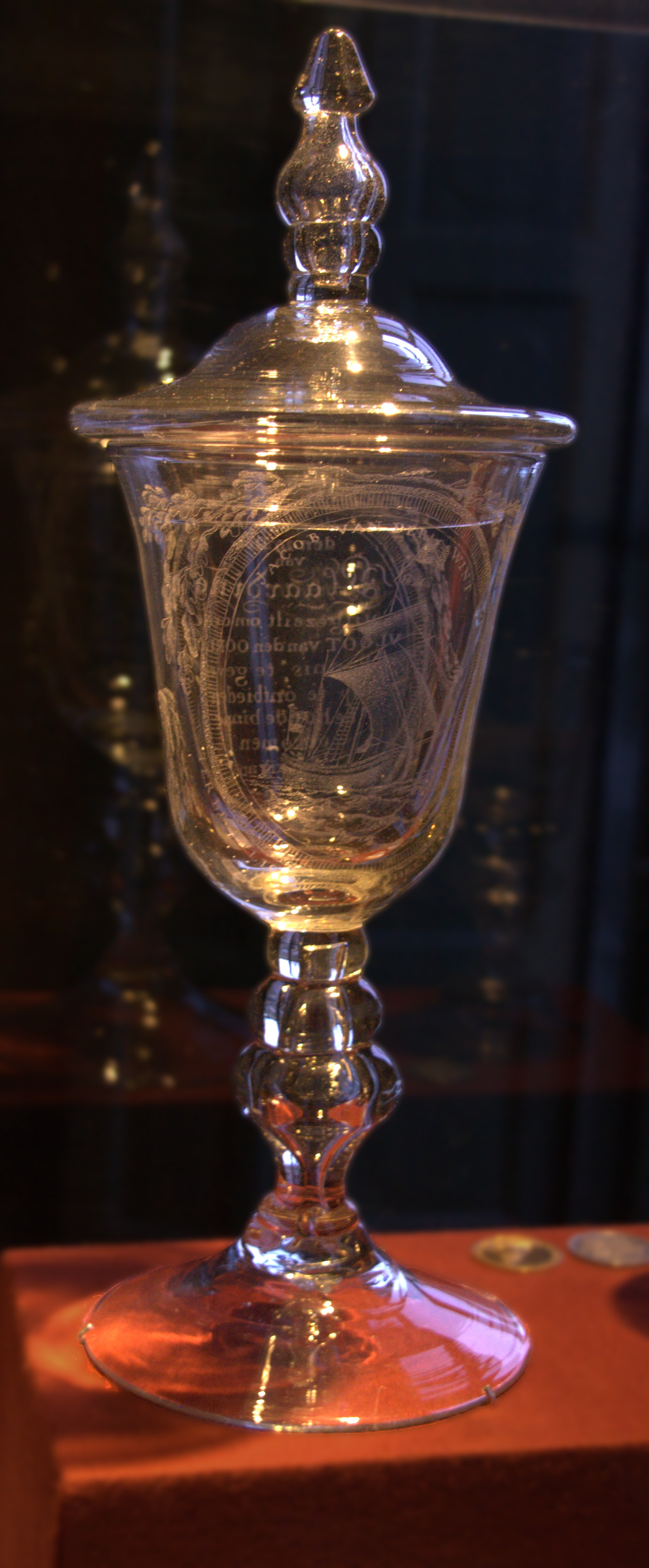
Glass goblet Jacob van der Windt - Museum Vlaardingen

Jacob van der Windt (baptized September 15, 1745 – October 15, 1792), also spelled van der Wint, from Vlaardingen was the skipper on the herring buss "De Roode Roos", owned by ship owner Assendelft de Coningh (1747–1803).

Because of the outbreak of the Fourth Anglo-Dutch War (1780–1784) he sailed from Brielle on December 29, 1780, to the fishing fleet of Vlaardingen en Maassluis consisting of respectively 82 and 63 vessels at the Dogger Bank. Thanks to this warning journey, only a few ships were attacked by the English. Nearly the entire fleet returned safely.

Van der Windt returned to Vlaardingen on January 11, 1781. He was honored with a silver commemorative medal and a glass goblet. On the front of both the medal and the jar is a representation of Van der Windt's ship.

The text on the glass goblet at Museum Vlaardingen reads: "1780 den 29 Dec van Vlaarding uitgezeilt om onse vloot van den oorlog kennis te geven op te ontbieden behoude binne gekomen den xi Jan 1781" (translated: "1780 the 29th of December of Vlaarding sailed out to inform our fleet of the war and to summon them, safely returned on the 11th of January 1781").
