= Van Wolfswinkel =

van Wolfswinkel is a Dutch surname that has been attested since 1711.

== Origin ==
The surname van Wolfswinkel traces its origins to a farm in the village Renswoude called "Klein Wolfswinkel" which translates to "small wolf's store/shop". The middle part van means "from" in Dutch. The name could either be from the farm being a store back then and where back then in the area where wolves would roam. Or it could be from the farm also being a store in those days owned by someone named Wolf (or Wulf as old translation could be).

The farm has had the name "Klein Wolfswinkel" since at least 1321. In 1920 the farm building, of Saxon type, was destroyed in a fire. The rebuilt building was so damaged by the Second World War that a new farm was built in 1950. Despite multiple versions of the surname, the original name remains "van Wolfswinkel".

The farm remained from January 31, 1696, until mid-19th century in the possession of the "van Wolfswinkel" bloodline. In the mid-19th century the farm was sold to the Baron Taets van Amerongen (the baron of Renswoude). Since 1974 the farm has been in possession of H. van den Dikkenberg and his descendants.

== Forefather ==
"De (The) Swarte Jan Arissen" is the man known to be the forefather of the van Wolfswinkel bloodline. His grandson Jan Arissen Swart gained ownership of the farm on January 31, 1696. His second son was, before August 18, 1711, (as it being the date of his loan deed of the farm), still known as Breunis Jansen Swart but after known as Breunis Jansen (van) Wolfswinkel.

== Related names ==
A group of related surnames like Wolfswinkel, Wolswinkel, Vanwolfswinkel and Wolleswinkel were also originally "van Wolfswinkel", but errors and changes have been made over time by the name bearers and the register offices.

== Notable members ==
- Ricky van Wolfswinkel (born 1989), Dutch soccer player

== Sources ==
- "Nederlandse Genealogieën deel 9" (Dutch Genealogies part 9)
