= Joann Aalfs =

American women's rights and LGBT rights activist (1923–2021)

- Born: March 29, 1923; St. Paul, Minnesota, U.S.
- Died: February 3, 2021 (aged 97); Northampton, Massachusetts, U.S.
- Known for: Women's rights activism
- Children: Janet Aalfs

Joann W. Aalfs (March 29, 1923 – February 3, 2021) was an American women's rights and LGBT rights activist.

== Early life and education ==
Joann Aalfs was born in 1923 in St. Paul, Minnesota to Cecelia Elizabeth Nesler and James Humphrey Wilkinson. She attended the Summit School in St. Paul, graduating in 1941, and earned her undergraduate degree at Bennington College in 1945. She attended Union Theological Seminary in New York.

== Career ==
Aalfs served alongside her then husband in various Presbyterian ministries, in areas such as Salem, New York and Kasur, Pakistan in 1951–1952.

Aalfs began, in 1963, organizing political rallies and social events with women in New Bedford, Massachusetts. She would work with the New Bedford Women's Center in 1972, Women and Violence from 1976 to 1977, and the Southeastern Massachusetts University Women's Center from 1972 to 1978.

In time, the New Bedford Women's Center's focus on activism for women's health, access to abortions, etc., left her unsatisfied. She wanted to be part of a women's community that focused more on consciousness-raising as a tool toward personal and cultural change. Ultimately Aalfs left the NBWC to help found the New Bedford Women's Awareness Group, which met more or less surreptitiously for several years in the 1970s and early 80s in the local YWCA. The group created Rough Draft, a newsletter that told stories of the women within the organization.

== Personal life ==
In 1950, Aalfs married John Linden Aalfs, with whom she had four children: Mary Linden (1951), Mark Stephen (1953), Janet Elizabeth (1956), and Thomas John (1958). Aalfs' daughter Janet is a poet and martial artist.

in 1980, Aalfs escaped what had been an abusive marriage (with the help of Boston College professor, Mary Daly, some of whose classes she had attended) and divorced her husband. Aalfs took refuge at the Battered Women's Shelter in Springfield, Massachusetts until moving to Northampton, MA in 1981; she moved to Wendell, MA in 1989 and then back to Northampton in 1993.

By 2004, Aalfs had come out as a lesbian and began organizing to help other lesbians in New Bedford, Massachusetts and Northampton, Massachusetts. She died in February 2021 at the age of 97.
