= Ruis =

Ruis can mean:

- Ruis (letter), a letter of the Ogham alphabet
- Ruis, Switzerland, a kreis in Switzerland
- the municipality of Rueun in Switzerland, formerly known as Ruis
- Rye, which translates to "ruis" in the Finnish language
- RUIS acronym of Revolutionary Union for Internationalist Solidarity, an anarchist militia in the Syrian Civil War.
- Willem Ruis, Dutch game show presenter

== See also ==
- Ruiz
