= Ruth Buskirk =

American biologist

Ruth Buskirk is an American biologist and Distinguished Senior Lecturer in Biology at The University of Texas at Austin. Her early research on the aggressive and colonial behavior of orb-weaving spiders has been cited in later studies of spider communication and sociality, and she is also known for research into reported unusual animal behavior before earthquakes.

== Education ==
Buskirk holds a B.A. from Earlham College, an M.A. from Harvard University, and a Ph.D. from the University of California, Davis. In a 2014 interview for the University of Texas at Austin's College of Natural Sciences, Buskirk credited her undergraduate years with shaping her path into research. She said her small college nonetheless had a strong biology program, which allowed her to take part in undergraduate research, and described this opportunity as fortunate. She also traced her early interest in the natural world to childhood family camping trips and visits to national parks.

== Research ==
=== Spider behavior ===
In the mid-1970s, Buskirk studied the colonial orb-weaving spider Metabus gravidus in Costa Rica, examining how the spiders selected habitat, fed, and organized their activity within multilayered colonial web structures spun over mountain streams. A companion study documented that individual web-holders within these colonies use a hierarchy of aggressive displays including bouncing, web-jerking, chasing, and fighting to defend feeding territory and space out webs within the colony, despite the spiders not cooperating directly in web-building or prey capture. Her findings have continued to inform later research on aggression and communication in colonial and social spiders; a 2022 study of a related colonial species in the western Amazon, covered by the science-news outlet ScienceDaily, cited her work in describing how individual web-holders in aggregated but non-social spider species respond aggressively to intruders.

Buskirk's most cited paper was "The natural selection of sexual cannibalism," which presented a mathematical model of conditions under which a male that has impregnated a female, and has a low probability of securing another mate, might allow himself to be eaten by the female, thus potentially contributing biomass to offspring. Occasional observations of mate cannibalism in praying mantids and black widow spiders were pertinent. The evolutionary biologist Stephen Jay Gould discussed this publication in his essay "Only His Wings Remained", published originally in Natural History magazine and subsequently as a chapter in his 1985 book The Flamingo's Smile (Norton).

=== Earthquake precursor research ===
In 1981, Buskirk co-authored a review in Reviews of Geophysics examining reports of unusual behavior in animals such as catfish, snakes, birds, and domestic animals before earthquakes, comparing these historical reports with laboratory studies of animal sensory thresholds. Writing in The Washington Post in 2005, in an article examining why animals appeared to have sensed the 2004 Indian Ocean earthquake and tsunami before it struck, Buskirk suggested that background noise the clutter of sensory stimuli that occurs during an earthquake may make it difficult to isolate which specific cues animals are reacting to. Her 1981 review has continued to be cited in later research on earthquake precursors, including a 2024 review of animal-behavior-based earthquake prediction methods.

== Career and teaching ==
Since 1984, Buskirk has taught biology at The University of Texas at Austin. Profiling her in 2013 for the Texas 10, an annual teaching honor selected from alumni nominations by the Texas Exes alumni association, the association's magazine, The Alcalde, described her approach of keeping students engaged through hands-on activities rather than lecturing alone, quoting her observation that students today are used to finding information online but "really have to work to understand the concepts," which she described as the central challenge facing her students.

== Awards ==
Buskirk's teaching awards and fellowships include the Texas 10 Award from the Texas Exes alumni association (2013), which was reported independently by The Alcalde,as well as the following, per her university's own published record of faculty honors:

- Natural Sciences Council Teaching Excellence Award (1993, 1994, 1996)
- Alpha Lambda Delta and Phi Eta Sigma Teaching Excellence Award (1994, 1998, 2000, 2003)
- Worthington Endowed Professorship for Ecology and Evolutionary Biology in Plan II (2009–2021)
- College of Natural Sciences Teaching Excellence Award (2003)
- National Academies Education Fellow in the Life Sciences (2008–2009)
- Regents' Outstanding Teaching Award, University of Texas System (2009)
- Chad Oliver Teaching Award, Plan II Honors Program (2012)
- President's Associates Teaching Excellence Award (2013)
- Provost's Teaching Fellows, inaugural fellow (2013)
- Academy of Distinguished Teachers, elected (2023)
