= Cley Hall =

Historic house in Norfolk, England

Coordinates: 52°57′13″N 1°02′43″E

Cley Hall, in Cley next the Sea, Norfolk, is a Grade II listed house in Norfolk.
