= Dijkgraaf, Gelderland =

Canal in the Netherlands

The Dijkgraaf is a partly disappeared water course to the north of the city of Wageningen, and in the municipality of the same name.
