= Teulings =

Teulings is a Dutch-language surname.

- Coen Teulings (born 1958), Dutch economist
- Frans Teulings (1891–1966), Dutch politician
- Jan Teulings (1905–1989), Dutch actor
- Jarne Teulings (born 2002), Belgian footballer
