= Kley =

Kley is a surname. Notable people with the surname include:

- Chaney Kley (1972–2007), American actor
- Dale K. Van Kley (born 1941), American historian
- Heinrich Kley (1863–1945), German illustrator
- Ivan Kley (1958–2025), Brazilian tennis player
- Karl-Ludwig Kley (born 1951), German businessman
