= Vinke =

Vinke is a surname. Notable people with the surname include:

- Cécile Vinke (born 1973), Dutch field hockey player
- Heinz Vinke (1920–1944), German aviator
- Peter Vinke (died 1702), English divine
- Philipine Vinke (born 1968), Dutch artist

== See also ==
- Finke (disambiguation)
