= Muis =

Muis, Muijs, or Muys (pronounced [mœys]) is a Dutch surname. It is either a patronymic, from a short form of the given name Bartholomeus, or can be metaphoric or descriptive, referring to a mouse (modern Dutch muis). The Sumatran (pronounced [muɪs]) and French (pronounced [də mɥi]) surnames have different origins. People with this name include:

- Abdul Muis (1886–1959), Indonesian writer, journalist and nationalist
- Albert Muis (1914–1988), Dutch painter
- Bas Muijs (born 1976), Dutch actor and presenter
- Cornelis Muys (1500–1572), Dutch Catholic priest and New Latin poet known as Cornelis Musius
- Jan Muijs (1898–1968), Dutch Greco-Roman wrestler
- Krista R. Muis, Canadian academic psychologist
- Marianne Muis (born 1968), Dutch swimmer, twin sister of Mildred
- Mildred Muis (born 1968), Dutch swimmer, twin sister of Marianne

== See also ==
- Siméon Marotte de Muis (1587–1644), French churchman and Hebraist
- MUIS
