= Elzinga =

Elzinga is a Dutch surname from the provinces of Friesland and Groningen. Originally meaning from the "house of Elso/Elze", it was in 1811, when surnames needed to be adopted by those families still using patronyms, adopted as a metonymic occupational surname, referring to the els (awl), used by shoemakers. Variant forms are Elsinga and Elzenga. People with this surname include:

- Aant Elzinga (born 1937), Dutch-born science politics and history scholar
- Kenneth G. Elzinga (born 1941), American economist and crime fiction writer
- Peter Elzinga (1944–2023), Canadian politician
- Peter Elzinga (archer) (born 1981), Dutch archer
