= Dorine van der Klei =

Dutch singer, songwriter, photographer and journalist

- Born: Dorine van der Klei; September 13, 1940; Amsterdam, Netherlands
- Died: February 16, 2025 (aged 84); Amsterdam, Netherlands
- Occupations: Singer, songwriter, photographer, journalist

Dorine van der Klei (13 September 1940 – 16 February 2025) was a Dutch singer, songwriter, photographer, and journalist.

== Early life ==
Van der Klei was born in Amsterdam to artist Dora van der Veen and dentist and pianist Justus Herman van der Klei. She spent part of her childhood in Amstelveen before returning to Amsterdam. Her parents were active in the Dutch art world and served on the board of Arti et Amicitiae.

Through her family she was also related to resistance fighter and artist Gerrit van der Veen, who was executed during the Second World War.

She attended the Amsterdams Lyceum and later studied at the Gerrit Rietveld Academie.

== Career ==
Van der Klei began her career as a journalist and photographer, contributing articles and photo reports to publications including Het Vrije Volk, Het Parool, Vrij Nederland, and Algemeen Handelsblad. One of her best-known photographic projects was Kinderen in de Jordaan, documenting everyday life in Amsterdam's Jordaan neighbourhood.

In 1971 she entered the theatre with her younger sister Gerrie van der Klei as the musical duo The Sissies. Accompanied by pianist Boudewijn Leeuwenberg, the duo performed songs from the 1920s and 1930s in new arrangements. The partnership ended in 1975.

She subsequently launched a solo career with the theatre programme O was ik maar nooit getrouwd, featuring satirical songs about women's emancipation from 1880 to 1940. She also appeared in the television series Klaverweide, the children's programme Klap es in je handjes, and the film Dokter Vlimmen.

During the late 1970s and 1980s she toured the Netherlands with productions including Leven is sloven en liefde is lastig, Wein ich, lach' ich?, and Ga maar rustig slapen, the latter focusing on songs about the Second World War.

In the 1990s and 2000s she continued performing in productions including Daniël en zijn moeder and Gaan we weer rustig slapen, often together with Daniël Cohen. She also organised and published selections from her photographic archive, including the book Kinderen in de Jordaan.

== Later years ==
Van der Klei continued to perform occasionally into her eighties, including concerts with her son in 2022. She was preparing a new theatre production, Geen woord gelogen, for the 2025–26 theatre season when she died on 16 February 2025 at the age of 84.
