= Kleis =

Kleis is a surname. Notable people with the surname include:

- Birgit Kleis (born 1956), Danish politician
- Dave Kleis (born 1964), American politician
- Martin Kleis (1850–1908), Danish trader on Nui
- Mikkel Kleis, winner of the 2010 Copenhagen Marathon

== See also ==
- Kleis Site
- Klaus
