= Dijksma =

Dijksma is a Dutch surname. Notable people with the surname include:

- Harry Dijksma, Dutch politician
- Roelof Dijksma (1895–1975), Dutch millwright known for construction of tjasker mills
- Sharon Dijksma (born 1971), Dutch politician
