= Tuinstra =

Tuinstra is a surname. Notable people with the surname include:

- Bennie Tuinstra (born 2000), Dutch volleyball player
- Klaas Tuinstra (1945–2022), Dutch politician
- Stef Tuinstra (born 1954), Dutch organist
