= Anthony Ruys =

Dutch businessman

Anthony Ruys (born 20 July 1947, Antwerp) is a former chairman of the executive board of Heineken N.V.

Ruys holds a degree in commercial law from the University of Utrecht and a master's degree from Harvard Business School. He started his career for Unilever, where he worked as marketing director and chairman for various subsidiaries of Unilever in the Netherlands, Colombia and Italy from 1974 to 1992. In 1993, Ruys was appointed executive board member at Heineken N.V. He was chief executive officer from 2003 to 2005.

He was appointed an Officer of the Order of Orange-Nassau by the Dutch government in 2005.

== Directorships and advisory roles ==
- Member of the supervisory board of Stichting laluz
- Member of the board of the digital consultancy SparkOptimus.
