= Roosevelt (name) =

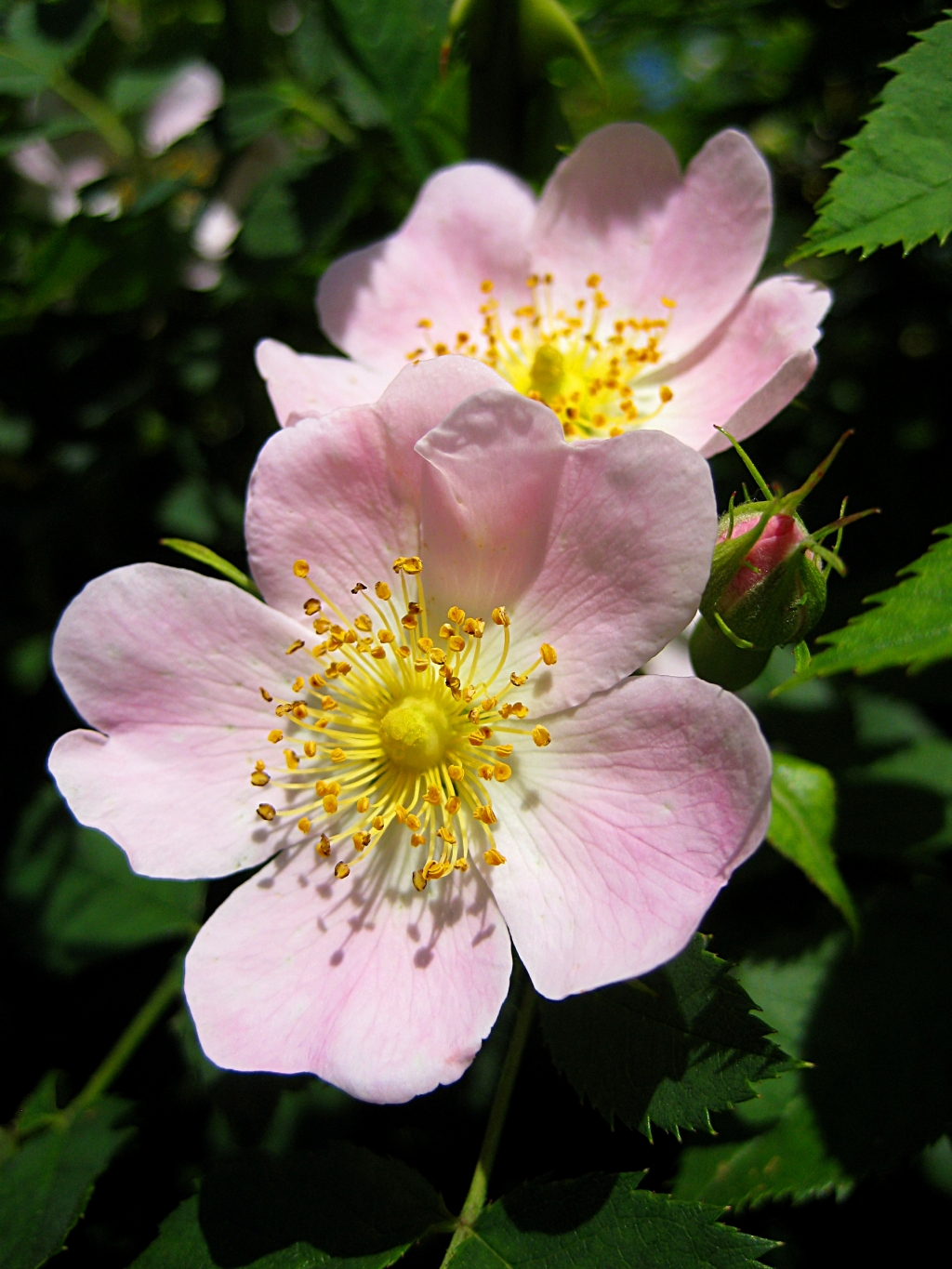
- A wild European rose.
- Pronunciation: /ˈroʊz(ə)vɛlt, -vəlt, ˈruːzə-/
- Language: Dutch

Origin
- Meaning: Derived from the elements van, roose and velt meaning "from the rose fields"
- Region of origin: The Netherlands

Other names
- Related names: Rosevelt, Van Rosevelt, Van Roosenvelt and Van Rosenvelt

The name Roosevelt is an American topographic surname derived from the Dutch surname Van Rose(n)velt, meaning "from rose field". The most famous bearers of this name come from the Roosevelt family, a mercantile and political family descended from the 17th-century immigrant to New Netherland Claes Maartenszen van Rosenvelt.

== Statistics ==
In the United States, the surname ranked as the 15,060th most common surname in the 1990 U.S. census, accounting for 0.001% of the American population. By the 2000 U.S. census, the surname was ranked as the 24,406th most common family name. There were 961 individuals recorded at that time using the surname Roosevelt, and of these, 64% identified as being white, 27.26% black, 1.87% Asian and Pacific Islander, 1.77% American Indian and Native Alaskan and 1.66% of Hispanic ethnic origin.

== Notable Roosevelts ==
=== Van Rosevelts of Oud-Vossemeer ===
In 1410, William III, Duke of Bavaria, Count of Holland and of Zeeland granted amt fiefdoms north of Tholen to six lords. An amt fief was a grant of land to vassal lords where the land had been or needed to be dyked and reclaimed from the sea. The vassal lords held several powers from their position, such as appointing the steward and alderman that governed the municipal area, inflicting corporal punishment and even pass death sentences by hanging in several situations.

One of the first amt lords was Marijnus van Rosevelt, whose lordship dates back to 1697. Johan Willem van Rosevelt, LL.M, was also an amt lord from 1731 until 1790, and also held the prominent positions of steward of Vossemeer, councilor, alderman and pensionary of Goes, Steward of the Count's Domains to oversee clerical goods, common means and taxes in Biervliet, deputy councilor of Zeeland and admiralty councilor. The Van Rosevelt name holds a place of prominence in the Oud-Vossemeer House of Amt Lords, which was constructed in 1767, even amongst the other amt lords.

It has been suggested that Claes van Rosenvelt was related to the Van Rosevelts of Oud-Vossemeer, and evidence suggests that Claes van Rosenvelt indeed came from the Tholen region where the Van Rosevelts were land owners, but no records exist that prove any relation of the two families.

=== Roosevelts, the American political and business family ===
Claes Maartenszen van Rosenvelt, the immigrant ancestor of the Roosevelt family, arrived in Nieuw Amsterdam (present day New York City) some time between 1638 and 1649. Around the year 1652, he bought a farm from Lambert van Valckenburgh comprising twenty-four morgens (48 acres (19 ha)) in what is now Midtown Manhattan, including the present site of the Empire State Building. The property included roughly what is now the area between Lexington Avenue and Fifth Avenue bounded by 29th St. and 35th St.

Claes' son Nicholas was the first to use the spelling Roosevelt and the first to hold political office, as an alderman. His children Johannes and Jacobus were the progenitors of the Oyster Bay and Hyde Park branches of the family that emerged in the 18th century, respectively. By the late 19th century, the Hyde Park Roosevelts were generally associated with the Democratic Party and the Oyster Bay Roosevelts with the Republican Party. President Theodore Roosevelt, an Oyster Bay Roosevelt, was President Franklin Roosevelt's fifth cousin. Despite political differences that led family members to actively campaign against each other, the two branches generally remained friendly. James Roosevelt, Sr. met his wife at a Roosevelt family gathering in the home of Theodore's mother, and James' son Franklin married Theodore's niece Eleanor.

== Coats of arms ==
It is a common misconception that there is one coat of arms associated to everyone of a common surname, when, in fact, a coat of arms is property passed through direct lineage. This means that there are numerous families of Roosevelt, perhaps under various spellings, that are related, but because they are not the direct descendants of a Roosevelt that owned an armorial device do not have rights or claims to any arms themselves.

In heraldry, canting arms are a visual or pictorial play on a surname, and were and still are a popular practice. It would be common to find roses, then, in arms of many Roosevelt families, even unrelated ones. Also, grassy mounds or fields of green would be a familiar attribute.

The Van Rosevelts of Oud-Vossemeer, in the Tholen region of Zeeland, have a coat of arms that is divided horizontally, the top portion with a white chevron between three white roses, while the bottom half is gold with a red lion rampant. The upper portion is simply a cant of the Van Rosevelt name, which means "from the rose fields". The lower portion was likely added to the heraldic achievement after the family gained the amt lordship, as a representation of their land ownership. The coat of arms of the province of Zeeland has a red lion rising from waters on a gold field, while the town of Oud-Vossemeer use similar arms but with a red wolf, so the red lion of the Van Rosevelts is either directly taken from the Zeeland arms or an allusion to both Zeeland and Oud-Vossemeer. A traditional blazon suggested would be, Per fess vert a chevron between three roses argent and Or a lion rampant gules.

The coat of arms of the Dutch burgher Claes van Rosenvelt, ancestor of the American political family that included Theodore and Franklin D. Roosevelt, were white with a rosebush with three rose flowers growing upon a grassy mound, and whose crest was of three ostrich feathers divided into red and white halves each. In heraldic terms this would be described as, Argent upon a grassy mound a rose bush proper bearing three roses gules barbed and seeded all proper, with a crest upon a torse argent and gules of Three ostrich plumes each per pale gules and argent. Franklin Roosevelt altered his arms to rid of the rosebush and use in its place three crossed roses on their stems, changing the blazon of his shield to Three roses one in pale and two in saltire gules barbed seeded slipped and leaved proper.
