= Janet Aalfs =

American poet, martial artist

- Born: Janet Elizabeth Aalfs; August 14, 1956 (age 70); Elmira, New York, U.S.
- Education: Hampshire College (BA); Sarah Lawrence College (MFA)
- Occupations: Poet; martial artist; community educator
- Known for: Poet Laureate of Northampton, Massachusetts
- Parent: Joann Aalfs

Janet Elizabeth Aalfs (born August 14, 1956) is an American poet and martial artist. She is a founding member of Valley Women's Martial Arts and the National Women's Martial Arts Federation, and founder and director of Lotus Peace Arts. She served as poet laureate of Northampton, Massachusetts from 2003 to 2005.

== Early life and education ==
As a 13-year-old, Aalfs wrote her first poem, and began focusing on her writing practice. Her father (1922–2001), a minister, is credited with teaching Aalfs about the Civil Rights Movement of the 1960s. By the age of sixteen, Aalfs had participated in assisting her mother in the founding of the women's center in New Bedford, Massachusetts, read and found inspiration in Sisterhood is Powerful, and had her poems published by the women's center at Southeastern Massachusetts University.

== Career ==
During her first year at Hampshire College in 1974, she joined the women's center and registered for women's studies classes at University of Massachusetts. While still in college, Aalfs came out of the closet as a lesbian. She would go on to get her Master of Fine Arts degree from Sarah Lawrence College. Shortly afterwards, she joined a women's writing group, and eventually co-founded two lesbian writing groups: Calypso Borealis and the Tuesday Night Lesbian Writers Group. She also co-founded Orogeny Press, a publishing house for fiction and lesbian poetry.

In 1977, Aalfs began practicing martial arts. She became a member of Valley Women's Martial Arts and created VWMA's Institute for Healing and Violence Prevention Strategies (HAVPS: "have peace"). She is a founding member of the National Women's Martial Arts Federation and co-founder of NWMAF's Empowerment Self-Defense Instructor Certification program. Aalfs, founder and director of Lotus Peace Arts, has served as the director and member of the Leaders Group of VWMA, now Heron's Bridge/VWMA, since 1982. She holds an eighth-degree black belt in Shuri-ryū, an eighth-degree black belt in Modern Arnis, and is a Jian Mei Chief Instructor of tai chi and qigong.

Between 2003 and 2005, she served as the poet laureate for Northampton, Massachusetts. In 2013, she received the Leadership and Advocacy in the Arts Award from the Center for Women and Community at University of Massachusetts Amherst.
