= Ruysch =

Ruysch, Ruisch or Ruijsch is a Dutch patronymic surname, derived from the archaic Dutch given name Ruis. Variant forms are Ruijs, Ruis and Ruisch. People with the surname include:

- Aletta Ruijsch (1860–1930), Dutch artist
- Anna Ruysch (1666–1741), Dutch flower painter, daughter of Frederik Ruysch
- Eef Ruisch, Dutch footballer
- Frederik Ruysch (1638–1731), Dutch doctor and anatomist, remembered for his developments in anatomical preservation
- Johannes Ruysch (c.1460–1533), Dutch explorer, cartographer, astronomer, manuscript illustrator and painter
  - Ruysch Map of the World, his 1507 map, second to show the New World
- Nicolaas Ruysch, Dutch Roman Catholic priest
- Rachel Ruysch (1664–1750), Dutch artist who specialized in still-life paintings of flowers, daughter of Frederik Ruysch

== See also ==
- Ruysch (crater) – Crater on Mercury
