= Van der Byl =

Van der Byl or Vanderbyl is a surname derived from the Dutch van der Bijl. Notable people with the surname include:

- Charles Van Der Byl (1874–1956), British fencer
- Michael Vanderbyl (born 1947), American graphic designer
- P. K. van der Byl (1923–1999), South African-born Rhodesian politician
- Philip Vanderbyl (1827–1892), British politician
- Pieter Voltelyn Graham van der Byl (1889–1975), South African soldier and politician

== See also ==
- Van der Bijl
