= Bylina (airline) =

Russian airline

IATA	ICAO	Call sign
-	BYL	BYLINA
- Founded: 2003
- Ceased operations: 2014
- Fleet size: 8
- Destinations: 8
- Parent company: Bylina Joint Stock Company
- Headquarters: Bykovo Airport, Russia
- Website: bylina-avia.ru

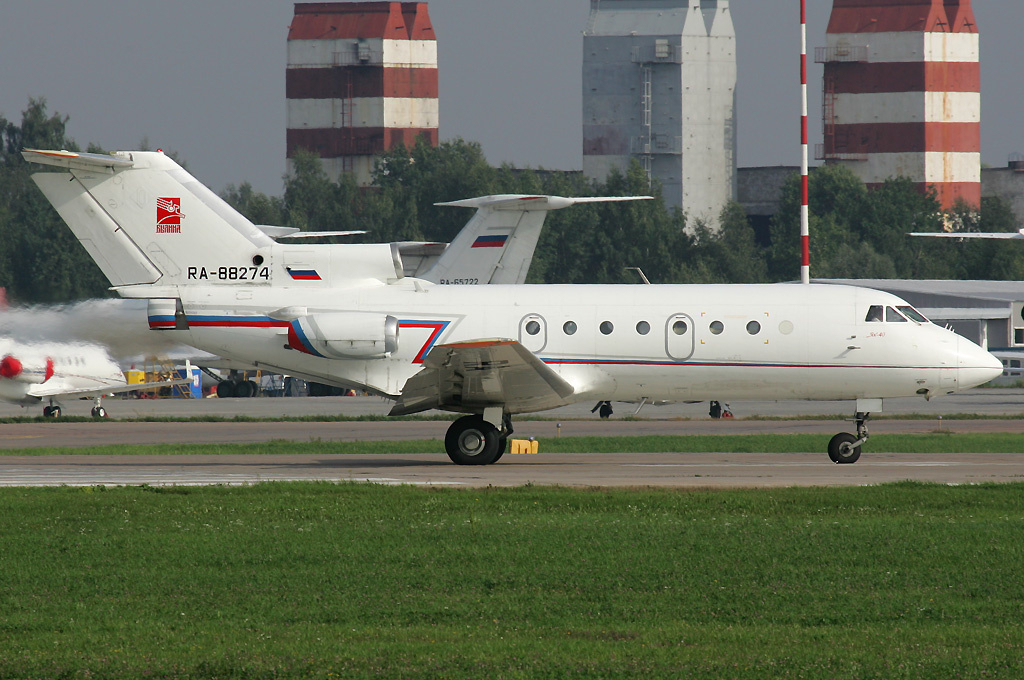
Yakovlev Yak-40

Bylina (Russian: Были́на) is an airline based in Bykovo Airport, Russia. It was established in 2003 and is a Russian executive private and business charter operator.

== Destinations ==
Russia

- Anapa - Anapa Airport
- Chelyabinsk - Chelyabinsk Airport
- Gelendzhik - Gelendzhik Airport
- Ivanovo - Ivanovo Yuzhny Airport
- Krasnodar - Pashkovsky Airport
- Perm - Bolshoye Savino Airport
- Simferopol - Simferopol International Airport
- Ulyanovsk - Ulyanovsk Baratayevka Airport

== Fleet ==
The Bylina fleet included the following aircraft (as June 2014):

- 5 Tupolev Tu-134 (RA-65944, RA-65805, RA-65574, RA-65097, RA-65906)
- 3 Yakovlev Yak-40 (RA-87334, RA-88263, RA-21506)
