= Ruijs–Aalfs syndrome =

- Autosomal recessive pattern is the inheritance manner of this condition.
- Specialty: Medical genetics
- Causes: Mutations in the SPRTN gene

Ruijs–Aalfs syndrome (RJALS) is a rare condition characterised by facial and skeletal abnormalities along with the development of hepatoma in the teenage years.

== Signs and symptoms ==
The main features of this condition are evident in skeleton and face

Facial features:

- Triangular face
- Small frontotemporal diameter
- Small deep set eyes
- Bulbous nose with high nasal bridge
- Small upper lip
- Micrognathia

Skeletal features:

- Thoracic kyphoscoliosis
- Sloping shoulders
- Pectus excavatum
- Elbow contractures
- Clinodactyly
- Pes planus
- Delayed bone age

Other associated conditions:

- Lipodystrophy
- Simian creases

All three patients developed liver cancer (hepatoma) in the teens.

== Genetics ==
This condition has been associated with mutations in the Spartan gene (SPRTN). This gene is located on the long arm of chromosome 1 (1q42.2). The gene SPRTN encodes the DNA dependent metalloprotease Spartan. Spartan is intimately involved in the repair of protein-linked DNA breaks.

== Pathophysiology ==
The syndrome is caused by mutations in the SPRTN gene, causing the loss of function in the Spartan protein. Since the Spartan protein is involved in the repair of DNA-protein crosslinks, the loss of function allows proteins to remain bonded to DNA, causing increased risk to cancer, as well as other genetic defects.

== Diagnosis ==
This syndrome may be suspected on clinical grounds. The diagnosis is established by sequencing the SPRTN gene

=== Differential diagnosis ===
- Werner syndrome

== Treatment ==
There is no specific treatment for this condition. Management is supportive.

== Epidemiology ==
This condition is considered to be rare, with only 3 cases reported in the literature.

== History ==
This condition was first described in 2003.
