= Van der Bijl =

Van der Bijl is a surname. Notable people with the surname include:

- Andrew van der Bijl (1928–2022), Dutch Christian missionary
- Hendrik van der Bijl (1887–1948), South African engineer and industrialist
- Paul Andries van der Bijl (1888–1939), South African mycologist
- Pieter van der Bijl (1907–1973), South African cricketer
- Vintcent van der Bijl (born 1948), South African cricketer

== See also ==
- Van der Byl
