= Cley next the Sea =

Village in Norfolk, England

Coordinates: 52°57′09″N 01°02′35″E

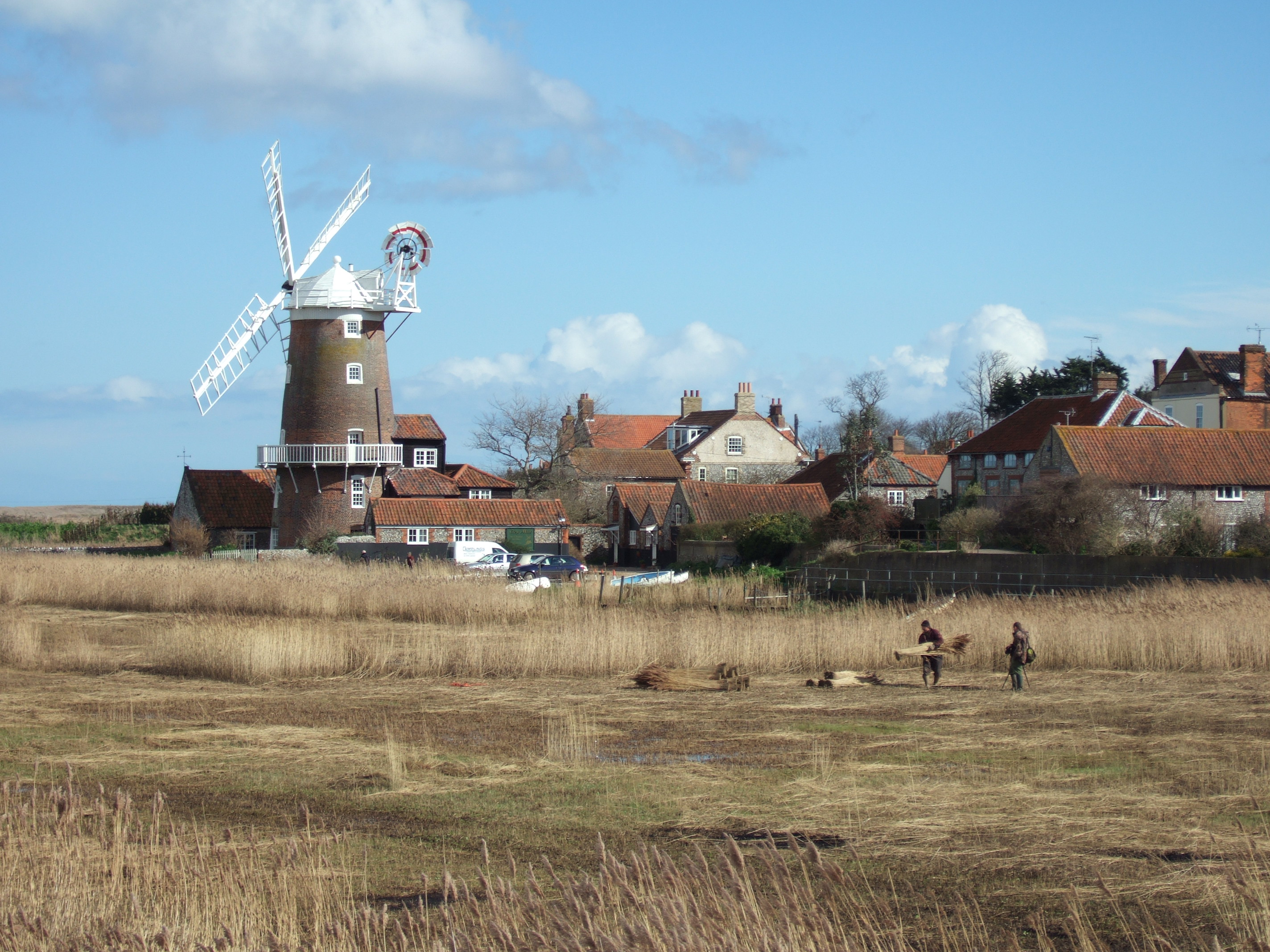
- Cley Windmill

- Location within Norfolk
- Area: 8.38 km^{2} (3.24 sq mi)
- Population: 401 (2021 census)
  - Density: 48/km^{2} (120/sq mi)
- OS grid reference: TG045436
  - London: 129 mi (208 km)
- Civil parish: Cley next the Sea
- District: North Norfolk
- Shire county: Norfolk
- Region: East
- Country: England
- Sovereign state: United Kingdom
- Post town: HOLT
- Postcode district: NR25
- Dialling code: 01263
- Police: Norfolk
- Fire: Norfolk
- Ambulance: East of England
- UK Parliament: North Norfolk

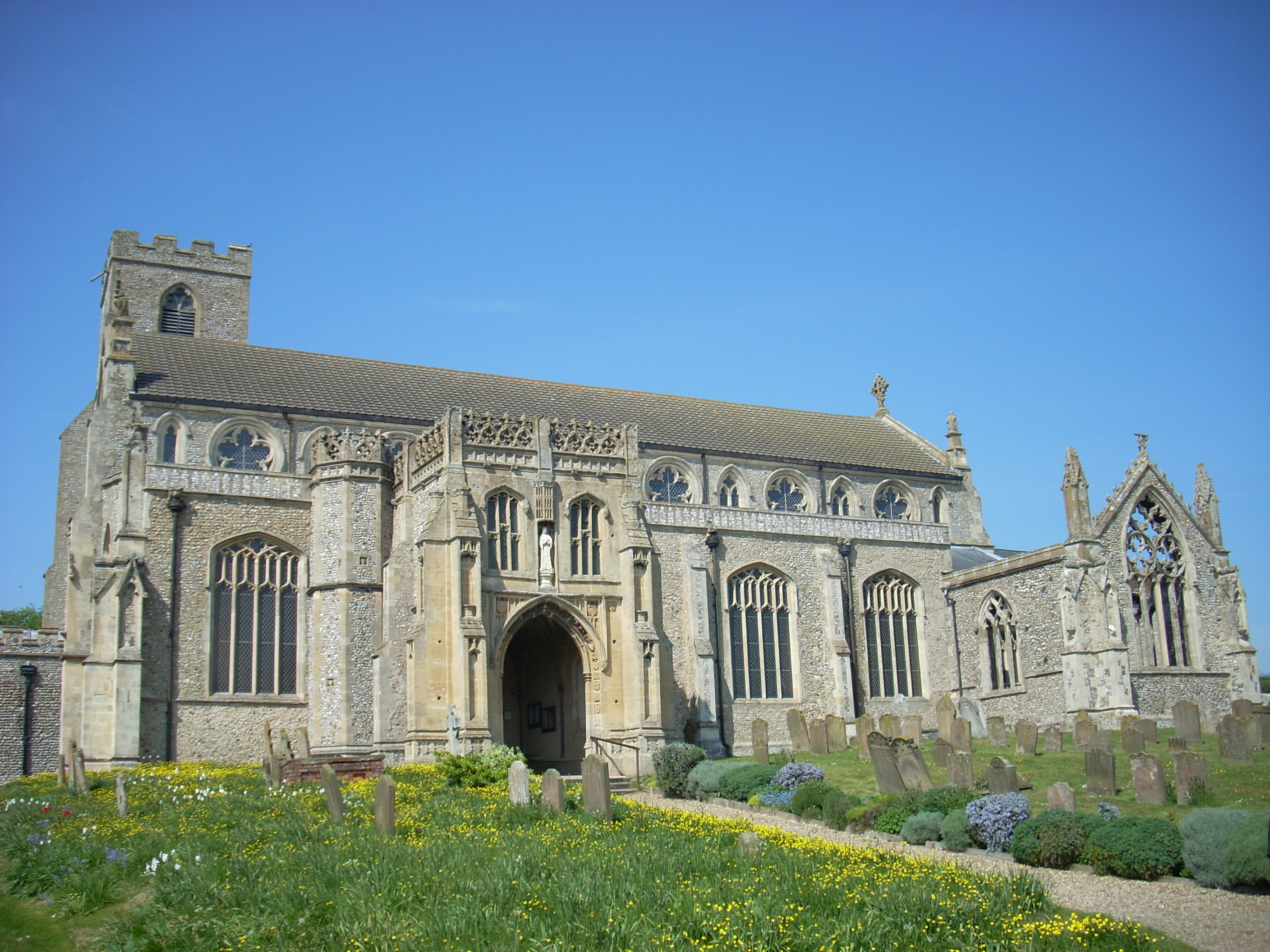
St Margaret's, Cley

Cley next the Sea (/ˈkleɪ/, /ˈklaɪ/) is a village and civil parish on the River Glaven in the English county of Norfolk.

Cley next the Sea is located 4.1 miles (6.6 km) north-west of Holt and 25 miles (40 km) north-west of Norwich.

== Pronunciation and etymology ==
The village's name is of Anglo-Saxon origin and derives from the Old English for 'clay'.

The pronunciation of the name "Cley" varies between "clay" (/ˈkleɪ/, rhyming with "day") and "cly" (/ˈklaɪ/, rhyming with "spy"). Scholars believe that the former pronunciation is more historically correct. The Domesday Book listed the town as "Claia", meaning "clay". Peter Trudgill, in Dialect Matters, explains that the original Anglo-Saxon name was Clæg, which meant 'clay'. He argues for the pronuciation "clay" in much the same manner that the Anglo-Saxon word dæg has become modern "day". The Friends of Norfolk Dialect website prefers "Clay". The village's own website, however, favours "cly".

== History ==
In the Domesday Book, Cley is recorded as a settlement of 38 households located in the hundred of Holt. In 1086, the village formed parts of the East Anglian estates of King William I.

A ruined building on the marshes is known as Blakeney Chapel; despite its name, it is in Cley parish, and probably never had a religious purpose. It is a Grade II listed building and scheduled monument which was likely an old iron smeltery.

After a devastating fire in 1612 destroyed 117 buildings, much of Cley was rebuilt in the prevailing architectural styles of the time.

Cley was once one of the busiest ports in England, where grain, malt, fish, spices, coal, cloth, barley and oats were exported or imported. The many Flemish gables in the town are a reminder of trade with the Low Countries. Despite its name, though, Cley has not been "next the sea" since the 17th century, due to land reclamation.

Some of the buildings that once lined the quay remain, notably the 18th-century Cley Windmill. The windmill, a five-storey tower mill, was owned by the family of singer James Blunt for many decades and operated as a bed and breakfast. The mill was sold in 2006, but continues to operate as a bed and breakfast on a non-profit making basis. It was used as a backdrop of the 1949 film Conspirator with Elizabeth Taylor. Cley Mill has often been depicted by local artists and was the subject of a painting by the 20th-century English landscape artist, Rowland Hilder.

Cley Hall is dated to 1770 and is a red-brick country house. The hall has been Grade II listed since 1952.

After the silting up of the port, Cley had to find another industry; in the late 19th century, it became a holiday resort. The poet Rupert Brooke was staying in Cley with classics professor Francis Macdonald Cornford and his wife, the poet Frances Cornford, early in August 1914 when news came that Britain had entered what was to become the First World War. Brooke had dreamt about the war and woke to find it a reality. He did not speak to his hosts all day until Frances Cornford said, "But Rupert, you won't have to fight?" to which Brooke replied, "We shall all have to fight".

During the Second World War, significant defences (including mortar pits, slit trenches and bunkers) were built in Cley to defend against a possible German invasion. There was also a prisoner-of-war camp in Cley during the conflict.

== Geography ==
According to the 2021 census, Cley next the Sea has a population of 401 people which shows a decrease from the 437 people recorded in the 2011 census.

The A149, between King's Lynn and Great Yarmouth, runs through the centre of the village, causing congestion in the summer months due to the tight, narrow streets.

== St Margaret's Church ==
Cley next the Sea's parish church is dedicated to Saint Margaret of Antioch and is located on Cley Green. St Margaret's dates from the 14th century and has been Grade I listed since 1960.

St Margaret's was built at the expense of the mercantile de Vaux family and was built by the mason, William de Ramsey, though the construction was halted during the Black Death. The church boasts several carved roundels, an elaborate Medieval font as well as a damaged set of royal arms from the reign of Queen Anne.

== Cley Marshes ==
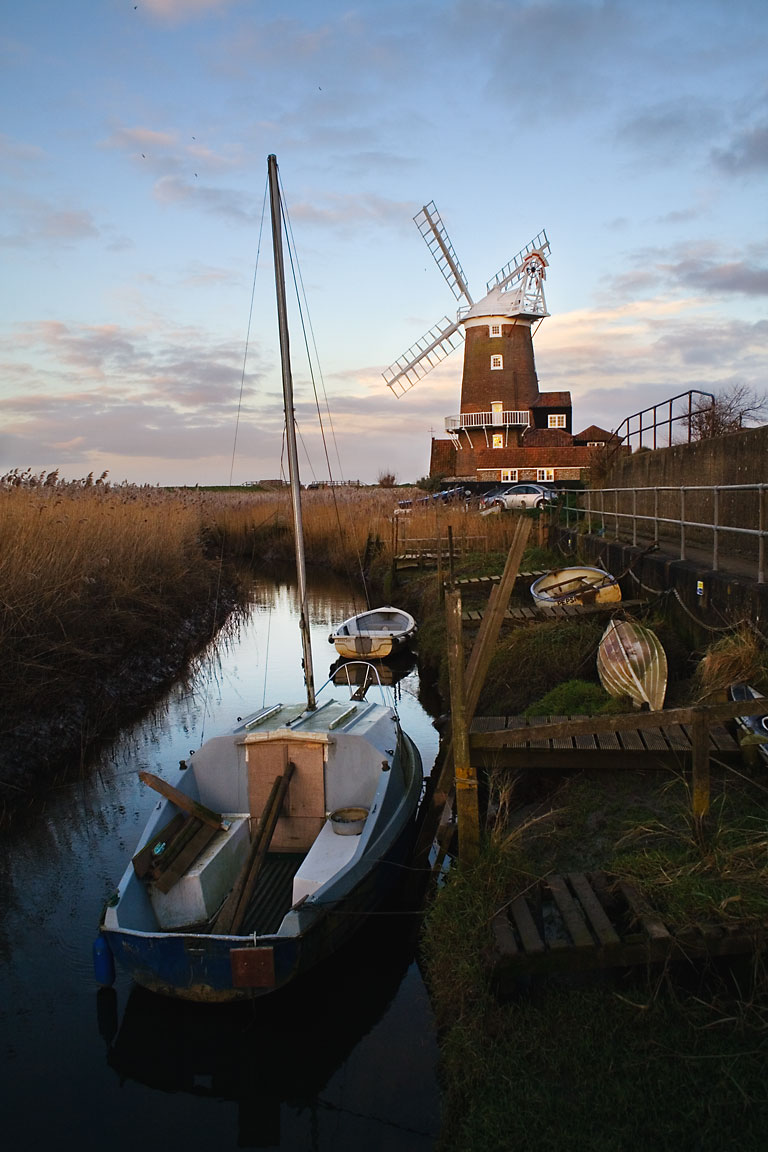
Cley towermill stands at the edge of the village, next to the coastal marshes and a network of drainage channels

The marshes around Cley are internationally important for their populations of rare breeding and visiting birds. Cley Marshes bird reserve has been in the care of the Norfolk Wildlife Trust since 1926, making it the oldest county Wildlife Trust reserve in Britain. Among resident breeding birds are avocet, bearded tit, bittern, marsh harrier and spoonbill. Winter visitors include brent goose, Eurasian wigeon, pintail and many species of wading birds. Cley, like neighbouring Salthouse, is ideally situated at the apex of the North Norfolk coast as a staging ground for passage migrants, vagrants and rarities of all kinds. A new eco-friendly visitor centre opened in 2007 containing a café, shop, viewing areas (including viewing from a camera on the reserve), exhibition area, interpretation and toilets. The view from the visitor centre across the marsh to the sea is breathtaking. Cley Marshes is the home of the Bird Information Service, publishers of Birding World. The shingle bank holds large numbers of yellow horned poppy.

== Sea defences ==
The salt and fresh water marshes used to be very well protected. However the cost of replenishing the shingle spit grew too much for the village to sustain. Once the repairing stopped, it became easier for waves to get through; in 1953 a large storm, measured at 5.12 m (16.8 ft) above ordnance datum hit the North Norfolk coast and the shingle ridge was mostly destroyed. A further storm surge in 1978 measured 4.19 m (13.7 ft) above ordnance datum and the protection measures confined flooding to the marshes and A149 coast road. The North Norfolk Shoreline Management Plan introduced by the Environment Agency has proposed a number of strategies in the light of continual erosion and predicted rising sea levels caused by global warming: these include Advance the line, Hold the line, Managed retreat and Do nothing. Even after extensive public consultation there is widespread local concern that the marshes will be lost to the North Sea.

== Notable residents and appearance in media ==
BBC One balloon over Cley

- William Jones was a merchant here in the 18th century. His daughter, Charlotte Jones, became a noted Royal miniature portrait painter.
- Singer and songwriter James Blunt spent time, in his early years, at his grandfather's and later his father's windmill in the village.
- Cley Old Hall was used as a location in the 1982 film The Ploughman's Lunch. During July 1997 the BBC filmed one of its BBC One balloon idents, which ran from 1997 to 2002, in the village.

== Governance ==
Cley next the Sea is part of the electoral ward of Coastal for local elections and is part of the district of North Norfolk.

The village's national constituency is North Norfolk, which has been represented by the Liberal Democrat Steff Aquarone MP since 2024.

== War memorials ==
Cley next the Sea's war memorials are two stone tablets inside St.Margaret's Church. They list the following names for the First World War:

Rank	Name	Unit	Date of death	Burial
2Lt.	Raven Couzens-Hardy	4th Bn., Norfolk Regiment	9 Oct. 1917	Tyne Cot
PO	Henry Rowe	HMS Invincible	31 May 1916	Portsmouth Memorial
POSt	Frank Whatley	HMS Aboukir	22 Sep. 1914	Portsmouth Memorial
Sgt.	Ernest W. E. Gibbs	2nd Bn., Norfolk Regt.	5 Jun. 1916	Kirkee War Cemetery
Cpl.	John T. Rayner	10th Bn., Essex Regiment	4 Mar. 1918	Seraucourt Cemetery
St1C	Herbert W. Ellwood	H.M. Tug Desire (Note: The Desire was sunk by SM UB-34 off the coast of Filey, East Riding of Yorkshire.)	20 Jan. 1918	Chatham Memorial
Bsth.	James W. Grimes	HMS Invincible	31 May 1916	Portsmouth Memorial
Gnr.	Valentine H. Pinchen	101st Bty., Royal Garrison Artillery	29 Aug. 1918	Tourgéville Cemetery
Gnr.	Charles A. Gidney	L Bty., Royal Horse Artillery	8 Sep. 1914	Baron Cemetery
Pte.	George W. Weston	1st Bn., Bedfordshire Regiment	27 Mar. 1918	Cremona Cemetery
Pte.	Herbert Holman	4th Bn., Bedfordshire Regt.	14 Jan. 1918	Fifteen Ravine Cem.
Pte.	William E. Barnes	2nd (British Columbia Mtd.) Bn., CEF	29 Sep. 1916	Vimy Memorial
Pte.	John E. Barnes	18th (Western Ontario) Bn., CEF	15 Sep. 1916	Vimy Memorial
Pte.	Bert W. E. Gibbs	11th Bn., East Yorkshire Regiment	4 May 1917	Duisans Cemetery
Pte.	George H. Drinkwater	13th Bn., East Yorks.	30 Jul. 1917	La Targette Cemetery
Pte.	Ralph Barnes	1st Bn., Essex Regiment	13 Aug. 1915	Helles Memorial
Pte.	Frederick J. Bishop	10th Bn., Essex Regt.	17 Oct. 1916	Contay British Cemetery
Pte.	Bertie F. Rowe	2nd Bn., Norfolk Regiment	4 Jul. 1916	Basra War Cemetery
Pte.	Harold J. Woodhouse	2/4th Bn., Norfolk Regt.	17 May 1915	St Margaret's Churchyd.
Pte.	Cecil J. Bolton	1/5th Bn., Norfolk Regt.	19 Apr. 1917	Jerusalem Memorial
Pte.	Herbert W. Williamson	7th Bn., Norfolk Regt.	20 Nov. 1915	Lillers Cemetery
Pte.	Frank Loades	8th Bn., Norfolk Regt.	19 Jul. 1916	Thiepval Memorial
Pte.	Cecil A. Gathercole	9th Bn., Norfolk Regt.	20 Nov. 1917	Ribécourt Cemetery
Pte.	Frederick W. Brett	1/4th Bn., Northumberland Fusilers	25 Oct. 1916	Thiepval Memorial
Pte.	Robert W. T. Leeder	3/4th Bn., Queen's Royal Regiment	5 Oct. 1917	Tyne Cot
Pte.	Albert G. Jeary	1st Bn., Royal Warwickshire Regt.	12 Oct. 1916	Thiepval Memorial
St2C	James G. Elvin	HMS Vivid	13 Sep. 1918	St Margaret's Churchyd.
Dhd.	George W. Grimes	H.M. Trawler St Ives	21 Dec. 1916	Chatham Memorial
Mr.	Lewis R. Mann	Merchant Marine (Note: Mann was killed as a passenger aboard the SS Fabala which was sunk by SM U-28.)	28 Mar. 1915	Callestick Cemetery

And, the following for the Second World War:

Rank	Name	Unit	Date of death	Burial
Lt.	Charles G. Bird	HMS Exeter	1 Mar. 1942	Plymouth Naval Memorial
Sgt.	William Voellner	No. 103 Squadron RAF	26 Aug. 1944	Littlehampton Cemetery
Sgt.	Fred Yarham	5th Bn., Royal Norfolk Regiment	1 Mar. 1943	Cremation Cem., Yokohama
Cpl.	Jack P. Ramm	2nd Bn., Royal Norfolk Regiment	4 May 1944	Kohima War Cemetery
LS	Francis A. Lewis	HMS Exmoor	25 Feb. 1941	Chatham Naval Memorial
LS	Sidney G. Twiddy	HMS Usk	3 May 1941	Chatham Naval Memorial
Pte.	Frank H. Dawson	7th Bn., Black Watch	19 Apr. 1945	Rheinberg War Cemetery
Pte.	Eric V. Brett	5th Bn., Royal Norfolk Regiment	21 May 1943 (Note: Brett died of Cholera whilst a prisoner of the Japanese.)	Kanchanaburi War Cemetery
Pte.	William N. Clarke	5th Bn., Royal Norfolks.	21 Sep. 1943	Chungkai War Cemetery
Pte.	George W. E. Clarke	6th Bn., Royal Norfolks.	18 Jan. 1942	Kranji War Memorial
