= Van (Dutch) =

Preposition used in Dutch surnames

Van (Dutch pronunciation: [fɑn]) is a very common prefix in Dutch surnames (including Flemish and Afrikaans), where it is known as a tussenvoegsel. In those cases it nearly always refers to a certain, often quite distant, ancestor's place of origin or residence; for example, Ludwig van Beethoven "from Beethoven" (supposedly Bettenhoven) and Rembrandt van Rijn "from the Rhine". (Note: While Rembrandt was actually born close to the Rhine, he merely inherited the name from his father, who already carried it. Van Beethoven neither lived nor was born in Bettenhoven, but a patrilinear ancestor perhaps was. Such names often go back centuries and may once have been mere self-imposed titles that their children then adopted.) Van is also a preposition in the Dutch and Afrikaans languages, meaning "of" or "from" depending on the context (similar to da, de, di and do in the Romance languages).

In surnames, it can appear by itself or in combination with an article (compare French de la, du, de l'). The most common cases of this are van de, van der and van den, where the articles are all current or archaic forms of the article de "the". Less common are van het and van 't, which use the similar but grammatically neuter article het. The contraction ver-, based on van der, is also common and can be written as a single word with the rest of the surname; an example being Johannes Vermeer (van der meer "of the lake").

Names in other languages may contain a component "Van" that is unrelated to the Dutch preposition.

== Spelling conventions ==
=== Collation and capitalisation ===
Collation and capitalisation of names differs between countries. In the Netherlands and Suriname, names starting with "van" are filed under the initial letter of the following name proper, so Johannes van der Waals is filed under "W", as: "Waals, Johannes van der" or "van der Waals, Johannes". The "v" is written in lower case, except when the surname is used as standalone (when the first name or initials are omitted), in which case it is capitalised, as in "de schilder Vincent van Gogh" and "de schilder Van Gogh" ("the painter Van Gogh"). In compound terms like "de Van Goghtentoonstelling" ("the Van Gogh exhibition") the "v" is capitalised, unless the connection between the person and the concept is or has become very weak.

In the Netherlands, tussenvoegsels are ignored when surnames are sorted alphabetically. In Belgium, any surnames beginning with "Van" or "van" are filed under "V". So for example Eric Van Rompuy is listed under the "V" section, not under the "R".

=== Concatenation ===
In some names, usually those of the Flemish/Belgian ones, and also some of the names of people from outside the Low Countries (with Dutch-speaking immigrant ancestors), the prefixes are concatenated to each other or to the name proper and form a single-worded or two-worded surnames, as in Vandervelde or Vande Velde. Prominent examples include "Vandenberg" and "Vanderbilt".

== Nobility ==
The German "von" is a linguistic cognate of the Dutch "van"; however, unlike the German "von", the Dutch "van" is not necessarily indicative of the person's nobility or royalty. Van has a history of being used by nobility and commoners alike to simply signify ancestral relation to a particular place (e.g. Willem van Oranje "William of the Principality of Orange [France]"; Jan van Ghent "John [who hails] from Ghent").

== See also ==
- Roosevelt (name), originally spelled "Van Rosevelt" or "Van Rosenvelt"
