= Tussenvoegsel =

Dutch family name affix

In a Dutch name, a tussenvoegsel (Dutch pronunciation: [ˈtʏsə(ɱ)ˌvuxsəl]; lit. 'intersertion' or 'that which is interserted') is a family name affix positioned between a person's given name and the main part of their family name. There are similar concepts in many languages, such as Celtic family name prefixes, French particles, and the German von.

The most common tussenvoegsels are van, e.g. Vincent van Gogh meaning "from"; and de, e.g. Greg de Vries, meaning "the". A tussenvoegsel forms an integral part of one's surname; it distinguishes it from similar Dutch surnames, e.g. Jan de Boer compared to Albert Boer; Frits de Kok compared to Wim Kok.

== History ==
Tussenvoegsels originate from the time that Dutch surnames officially came into use. Many of the names are place names, which refer to cities, e.g. Van Coevorden ("from Coevorden"), or geographical locations, e.g. Van de Velde ("of the field"). The list of tussenvoegsels mentioned below includes approximate translations, some of which have maintained their earlier meaning more than others.

== Usage ==
=== Netherlands ===
In the Netherlands, tussenvoegsels are ignored when surnames are sorted alphabetically. For example, in the Dutch telephone directory, "de Vries" is listed under "V", not "D". Therefore, tussenvoegsels in Dutch databases are recorded as a separate data field so as to simplify the process of locating it. Sorting by tussenvoegsel would result in many names being listed under "D" and "V".

In Dutch grammar, the tussenvoegsel in a surname is written with a capital letter only when it starts a sentence or is not preceded by a first name or initial. So referring to a professor named Peter whose surname is "de Vries", one writes "Professor De Vries", but when preceded by a first name or initial it is written using lower case, such as in "Peter de Vries" or "P. de Vries".

=== Belgium ===
In Belgian Dutch, or Flemish, surnames are collated with the full surname including tussenvoegsels. "De Smet" comes before "Desmet" in a telephone book. Although French family names commonly also use tussenvoegsels, those are frequently contracted into the surname, e.g. turning Le Roc into Leroc, or La Roche into Laroche, and thus explaining the collation preference.

In contrast to Dutch orthography, Belgian tussenvoegsels always keep their original orthography, e.g. meneer Van Der Velde, meneer P. Van Der Velde, or Peter Van Der Velde.

=== Other areas ===
In areas outside the Low Countries, tussenvoegsels are typically capitalized and used in sorting (as in Belgium). In areas where multi-word surnames are unfamiliar, to avoid confusion the tussenvoegsels are often concatenated to the name proper to form single-word surnames, as in "Vandervelde", "Vandenberg", and "Dewitte". Sometimes a surname of this sort will retain capital letters for each of the component words, such as "DeJong", "VanHerck", or even "VanDerBeek". Dutch family names in South Africa, e.g. Van der Merwe, follow Dutch rules.

== Common tussenvoegsels ==
Rijksdienst voor Identiteitsgegevens provides a list of tussenvoegsels coming from various languages (e.g., 'della', 'Unter', etc).

- af – "off", "from"
- aan – "at"
- bij – "near"
- de – "the" (but de can also be French for "of".)
- den, der, d' – "of the"
- het, 't – "the"
- in – "in"
- onder – "under", "below"
- op – "on", "at"
- over – "over", "beyond"
- 's – "of the", "from" (genitive)
- 't, te, ten, ter – "at"
- tot – "until", "to", "at"
- uit, uijt – "from", "out of"
- van – "from"
- voor – "to"

Combinations are also common:

- aan de, aan den, aan der, aan het, aan 't
- bij de, bij den, bij het, bij 't
- in de, in den, in der, in het, in 't
- onder de, onder den, onder het, onder 't
- over de, over den, over het, over 't
- op de, op den, op der, op het, op 't, op ten
- van de, van den, van der, van het, van 't, van ter, ver
- uit de, uit den, uit het, uit 't, uit ten
- voor de, voor den, voor in 't

== See also ==
- List of Dutch family names
