= Borst =

Borst is a Dutch surname of variable origin. Notable people with the surname include:

- Alexander Borst (born 1957), German neurobiologist
- Cathy Borst (born 1959), Canadian curler
- Dieter Borst (born 1950), German artist
- Els Borst (1932–2014), Dutch politician and government minister
- Everina Borst (1888–1943), Belgian radio personality known as Mother Sarov
- Hugo Borst (born 1962), Dutch writer, editor, TV personality and critic
- Jannie Borst, Dutch cancer immunologist
- Jeremiah Borst (1830–1890), American northwestern pioneer
- Lawrence Borst (1927–2016), American veterinarian and politician
- Peter Bouck Borst (1826–1882), American urban planner
- Peter I. Borst, (1797–1848) US House Representative from New York
- Piet Borst (born 1934), Dutch molecular biologist, cancer researcher and columnist
- Selma Borst (born 1989), Dutch distance runner

== Places ==
=== Croatia ===
- Boršt, Ogulin, a hamlet in Croatia

=== Slovenia ===
- Boršt, Brežice
- Boršt, Koper
- Boršt, Metlika
- Boršt, Novo Mesto
- Boršt pri Dvoru
