= Jos Beijnen =

Dutch pharmacist (born 1956)

Jacob Hendrik "Jos" Beijnen (born 5 June 1956) is a Dutch pharmacist. He is the hospital pharmacist of the Netherlands Cancer Institute/Antoni van Leeuwenhoekziekenhuis and previously held the same position at the Slotervaartziekenhuis. He has been a professor at the pharmaceutical faculty of Utrecht University since 1994.

== Career ==
Beijnen was born on 5 June 1956 in Beusichem. He studied pharmacy at Utrecht University and earned his doctor title in 1986 under professor A. Hulshoff. In 1994 he was appointed professor of bioanalysis at Utrecht University. In 1999 his chair was changed to analytical medicinaltoxicology. Beijnen was the doctoral advisor with the highest number of students obtaining a doctor title at Utrecht University in 2004, 2009, and 2013.

Beijnen was one of two members of the Board of the Slotervaartziekenhuis until 1 February 2014. In the years before the director of the hospital had been suspended and later sacked. The board members including Beijnen wished to sell the hospital to a certain party while the previous director sought to prevent this. Beijen and the other member of the board were replaced shortly after the takeover of the hospital by the MC Groep. After resigning from the board Beijnen stayed on as the hospital pharmacist of the combined Netherlands Cancer Institute/Antoni van Leeuwenhoekziekenhuis.

As hospital pharmacist of the Slotervaartziekenhuis Beijnen was since 1998 involved in the scientific experiment of selling heroin in a controlled environment to local addicts. A monopoly position was granted by the Ministry of Health, Welfare and Sport to the Slotervaartziekenhuis for the production of heroin. In November 2015 criticism was raised at both the hospital and Beijnen for their roles in overcharging the Ministry for several years.

Beijnen was elected a member of the Royal Netherlands Academy of Arts and Sciences in 2010.
