= Peter Peters =

Peter Peters may refer to:

- Peter Peters (rugby league) (born 1947), Australian rugby league player, commentator and journalist
- Peter Peters (football administrator) (born 1962), German journalist and football official
- Peter J. Peters (born 1957), professor of nanobiology
- Pete Peters (1946–2011), pastor of LaPorte Church of Christ
