= John D. Hood =

- Education: Texas A&M University
- Scientific career
- Workplaces: Impact Biomedicines, Inc.

John D. Hood is an American medical physiologist and pharmacologist and the founder and chief executive officer of Impact Biomedicines Inc.

== Education and career ==
Hood received his B.S. in biochemistry and obtained his Ph.D. in medical physiology from Texas A&M University.

Hood started his career as a Director of Research at TargeGen Inc . He was the co-founder and chief scientific officer of Samumed, a private biopharmaceutical company. Now, he is Board Chairman and Co-founder at Endeavor Biomedicines.

== Research ==
Hood did research on the development of TG101348 for the treatment of JAK2-driven malignancies and found that TG101348 blocked proliferation and colony formation in vitro against cultured and patient-derived cells bearing the JAK2^{v617F} mutations. He also conducted research on tumor regression by targeted gene delivery to the Neovasculature.

== Patents ==
Hood's patents include 3-(1H-imidazo[4,5-C]pyridin-2-yl)-1H-pyrazolo[3,4-B]pyridine and therapeutic uses thereof (US9889140B2), Indazole-3-carboxamides and their use as Wnt/beta-catenin signaling pathway inhibitors (US9802916B2), Indazole inhibitors of the Wnt signal pathway and therapeutic uses thereof (US9763927B2), β- and γ-diketones and γ-hydroxy ketones as WNT/β-catenin signaling pathway activators (US9884053B2), and 1H-pyrazolo[3,4-B]pyridines and therapeutic uses thereof (US9855272B2)

== Most cited peer-reviewed articles ==
- Hood JD, Cheresh DA. Role of integrins in cell invasion and migration. Nature Reviews Cancer. 2002 Feb;2(2):91-100. According to Google Scholar, this article has been cited 1991 times
- Hood JD, Bednarski M, Frausto R, Guccione S, Reisfeld RA, Xiang R, Cheresh DA. Tumor regression by targeted gene delivery to the neovasculature. Science. 2002 Jun 28;296(5577):2404-7.. According to Google Scholar, this article has been cited 1015 times.
- Eliceiri BP, Paul R, Schwartzberg PL, Hood JD, Leng J, Cheresh DA. Selective requirement for Src kinases during VEGF-induced angiogenesis and vascular permeability. Molecular cell. 1999 Dec 1;4(6):915-24. . According to Google Scholar, this article has been cited 856 times.
- Hood JD, Meininger CJ, Ziche M, Granger HJ. VEGF upregulates ecNOS message, protein, and NO production in human endothelial cells. American Journal of Physiology. Heart and Circulatory Physiology. 1998 Mar 1;274(3):H1054-8. According to Google Scholar, this article has been cited 828 times.
