= List of hospitals in the Netherlands =

This is a list of hospitals in the Netherlands.

Most general hospitals provide broad care. Early 2024 there were 143 hospital locations for general care. There are also a number of specialised centers that provide the most specialised care to the entire country or a larger region. These include specialised children hospitals. With the exception of the Juliana Children Hospital in The Hague, all Dutch Children Hospitals are part of a University hospital. Other specialised centers are the Netherlands Cancer Institute in Amsterdam, the national burn center associated with the Red Cross Hospital in Beverwijk, the Central Military Hospital, in Utrecht, and the national Major Incident Hospital (at University Medical Center Utrecht) consisting of a sleeping hospital with a capacity of 100 beds consisting of a mix of intensive, mid and low level care, surgery rooms etc. The Major Incident Hospital can be activated within 30 minutes.

== Types ==
=== University hospitals ===
The eight university hospitals offer the highest level of care available in the Netherlands. Each of these hospitals offers specialized services such as neurosurgery, cardiac surgery, a high-level emergency department, advanced oncology, departments for infectious diseases, and other services such a nuclear medicine generally not found in other hospitals.

The university hospitals are involved in the teaching of medical doctors and other medical staff. Their teaching includes teaching at all levels from vocational nursing training through undergraduate medical school (bachelor level) to MSc and PhD levels in medicine.

=== Non-university teaching hospitals ===
A number of hospitals that deliver a broad spectrum of specialised care at high level contribute to training of healthcare professionals by offering internships as part of the later years of university medical doctor training and contribute to education programmes of other medical staff (e.g. nursing, laboratory technicians).

=== Top Clinical Care hospitals ===
Several hospitals that provide broad care at the highest level, have organised themselves into an association of top hospitals. Hospitals can apply for membership if they provide (at least) 12 different specialisations at top level and contribute to teaching

=== Specialised hospitals ===
Several hospitals deliver high level care with a limited scope. Examples include the Antoni van Leeuwenhoek Hospital, Amsterdam that specialises in Oncology, the Rode Kruis Hospital, Beverwijk, specialising in burn treatment, the Centraal Militair Hospital which is the Military Hospital of the Armed forces of the Netherlands .

== List ==
(incomplete) Table of Hospitals in the Netherlands

Hospitals in the Netherlands
Name	Type	Subsidiaries/Comments	Municipality/City	Province	Website
Admiraal de Ruyterziekenhuis (ADRZ)	Training and Top hospital		Goes	Zeeland	https://www.adrz.nl/
Albert Schweitzer Ziekenhuis (ASz)	Training and Top hospital		Dordrecht	South Holland	https://www.asz.nl
Amphia ziekenhuis	Training and Top hospital		Breda	Noord Brabant	https://www.amphia.nl/
Amsterdam University Medical Centers (AUMC)	University Hospital	Emma Children Hospital/Amsterdam UMC has 2 locations and emerged from merger of the VU University Medical Center (VUmc) and Academic Medical Center (Amsterdam) (AMC)	Amsterdam	North Holland	https://www.amsterdamumc.org/
Antoni van Leeuwenhoekziekenhuis	Regional hospital	Specialises in oncology at national level with Netherlands Cancer Institute (NKI)	Amsterdam	North Holland	https://www.avl.nl/
Antonius Ziekenhuis	Regional hospital		Sneek	Friesland	https://www.mijnantonius.nl/sneek
Beatrixziekenhuis	Training hospital		Gorinchem	South Holland	https://www.rivas.nl/beatrixziekenhuis
Bernhoven Ziekenhuis	Training hospital		Uden	North Brabant	https://www.bernhoven.nl/
BovenIJ Ziekenhuis	Regional hospital		Amsterdam	North Holland	https://www.bovenij.nl/
Bravis Ziekenhuis	Training hospital		Bergen op Zoom	North Brabant	https://www.bravis.nl
Canisius-Wilhelmina Ziekenhuis (CWZ)	Training and Top hospital		Nijmegen	Gelderland	https://www.cwz.nl
Catharina Ziekenhuis	Training and Top hospital		Eindhoven	North Brabant	https://www.catharinaziekenhuis.nl
Centraal Militair Hospitaal (CMH)	Military hospital	Shares facilities with UMCU next door	Utrecht	Utrecht	https://www.defensie.nl/cmh
Delfzicht Ziekenhuis	Regional hospital		Delfzijl	Groningen	
Deventer Ziekenhuis	Training and Top hospital		Deventer	Overijssel	
Diaconessenhuis	Regional hospital		Leiden	South Holland	
Diakonessen Ziekenhuis	Training hospital	Location Utrecht, Location Zeist	Utrecht, Zeist	Utrecht	
Dijklander Ziekenhuis	Regional hospital	Location Hoorn, Location Purmerend	Hoorn, Purmerend	North Holland	
Elisabeth Tweesteden Ziekenhuis	Training and Top hospital	Merger of previous St. Elisabeth and TweeSteden hospitals	Tilburg	North Brabant	
Elkerliek Ziekenhuis	Training hospital		Helmond	North Brabant	
Erasmus MC (EMC)	University Hospital	Sophia Children's hospital	Rotterdam	South Holland	
Flevoziekenhuis	Training hospital		Almere	Flevoland	
Franciscus Ziekenhuis	Regional hospital		Roosendaal	Noord Brabant	
Frisius MC Leeuwarden	Training and Top hospital	Previously Medisch Centrum Leeuwarden	Leeuwarden	Friesland	https://www.frisiusmc.nl/
Frisius MC Heerenveen	Regional hospital	Previously Tjongerschans	Heerenveen	Friesland	
Gelderse Vallei	Training hospital		Ede	Gelderland	
Gelre Ziekenhuizen	Training and Top hospital	Lukas, Apeldoorn/ Spittaal, Zutphen	Apeldoorn, Zutphen	Gelderland	
Gemini Ziekenhuis	Regional hospital		Den Helder	North Holland	
Groene Hart Ziekenhuis	Training hospital		Gouda	South Holland	
Haaglanden Medisch Centrum	Training and Top hospital	Merger of previous Westeinde, Antoniushove and Bronovo Ziekenhuis. Bronovo location sometimes host members of the royal family and was the birth place of the three children of Willem Alexander	The Hague	South Holland	
Haga ziekenhuis	Training and Top hospital	Juliana Children's hospital	The Hague	South Holland	
Havenziekenhuis	Regional hospital		Rotterdam	South Holland	
IJsselland Ziekenhuis	Training hospital		Capelle aan den IJssel	South Holland	
IJsselmeerziekenhuizen	Regional hospital	Merger of previously independent Zuiderzeeziekenhuis, Lelystad and Dokter J.H. Jansenziekenhuis, Emmeloord	Lelystad / Emmeloord	Flevoland	
Ikazia	Training hospital		Rotterdam	South Holland	
Isala Meppel	Regional hospital	Previously Diaconessenhuis	Meppel	Drenthe	
Isala	Training hospital		Zwolle	Overijssel	
Jeroen Bosch Hospital	Training and Top hospital		's-Hertogenbosch	Noord Brabant	
Kempenhaeghe	Training hospital		Heeze	Noord Brabant	
Kennemer Gasthuis	Regional hospital		Haarlem	North Holland	
Laurentius Ziekenhuis	Training hospital		Roermond	Limburg	
Leiden University Medical Center (LUMC)	University Hospital		Leiden	South Holland	
Maasstad Ziekenhuis	Training and Top hospital	Includes specialised burn center	Rotterdam	South Holland	
Maastricht UMC+ (MUMC+)	University hospital		Maastricht	Limburg	
Maasziekenhuis Pantein	Training hospital		Boxmeer	Noord Brabant	
Martini ziekenhuis	Training hospital	Includes specialised burn center	Groningen	Groningen	
Maxima Medisch Centrum	Training and Top hospital		Eindhoven	Noord Brabant	
Meander Medisch Centrum	Training and Top hospital		Amersfoort	Utrecht	
Medisch Spectrum Twente	Training and Top hospital		Enschede	Overijssel	
Nijsmellinghe Ziekenhuis	Regional hospital		Drachten	Friesland	
Noordwest Ziekenhuisgroep, Medical Center Alkmaar	Training and Top hospital		Alkmaar	North Holland	
Onze Lieve Vrouwe Gasthuis (OLVG)	Training and Top hospital		Amsterdam	North Holland	
Orbis Medisch Centrum	Regional hospital		Sittard	Limburg	
Radboud University Nijmegen Medical Centre (RUMC)	University hospital	Amalia Children's hospital; previously, Universitair Medisch Centrum St. Radboud	Nijmegen	Gelderland	
Refaja Ziekenhuis	Regional hospital		Stadskanaal	Groningen	
Reinier de Graaf Gasthuis	Training and Top hospital	Previously Sint Hippolytus Ziekenhuis and Bethel Ziekenhuis	Delft	South Holland	
Rijnstate Ziekenhuis	Training and Top hospital		Arnhem	Gelderland	
Rivierenland Ziekenhuis	Training hospital		Tiel	Gelderland	
Rode Kruis Ziekenhuis	Training hospital	Includes specialised burn center	Beverwijk	North Holland	
Röpcke-Zweers Ziekenhuis	Regional hospital		Hardenberg	Overijssel	
Scheperziekenhuis	Regional hospital		Emmen	Drenthe	
SEIN Heemstede	Training hospital		Heemstede	North Holland	
SEIN Zwolle	Training hospital		Zwolle	Overijssel	
Sint Lucas Andreas Ziekenhuis	Regional hospital		Amsterdam	North Holland	
Sint Lucas Ziekenhuis	Regional hospital		Winschoten	Groningen	
Slingeland Ziekenhuis	Training hospital		Doetinchem	Gelderland	
Spaarne Gasthuis	Training and Top hospital	Locations Heemstede/Hoofddorp	Heemstede/Hoofddorp	North Holland	
St. Anna ziekenhuis	Training hospital		Geldrop	Noord Brabant	
St. Antoniusziekenhuis	Training and Top hospital	Location Nieuwegein, Location Utrecht Leidse Rijn	Nieuwegein, Utrecht	Utrecht	
St. Franciscus Gasthuis	Training and Top hospital	Location Gasthuis Rotterdam, Location Vlietland, Schiedam	Rotterdam, Schiedam	South Holland	
St. Jans Gasthuis	Regional hospital		Weert	Limburg	
St. Jansdal ziekenhuis	Training hospital		Harderwijk	Gelderland	
Streekziekenhuis Koningin Beatrix	Training hospital		Winterswijk	Gelderland	
Streekziekenhuis Rivierenland	Regional hospital		Tiel	Gelderland	
Tergooi ziekenhuis	Training hospital	Location Hilversum, Location Blaricum	Hilversum, Blaricum	North Holland	
Treant Zorggroep	Training hospital		Hoogeveen	Drenthe	
University Medical Center Groningen (UMCG)	University Hospital	Beatrix Children's Hospital	Groningen	Groningen	
University Medical Center Utrecht (UMCU)	University Hospital	Wilhelmina Children's Hospital; Prinses Maxima Center (children oncololgy); the national Major Incident Hospital (on standby until needed); closely collaborates with the Centraal Militair Hospitaal next door	Utrecht	Utrecht	
VieCuri Medisch Centrum	Training and Top hospital		Venlo, Venray	Limburg	
Wilhelminaziekenhuis	Training hospital		Assen	Drenthe	
Zaans Medisch Centrum	Training hospital	Previously known as de Heel	Zaandam	North Holland	
Ziekenhuis Amstelland	Regional hospital		Amstelveen	North Holland	
Ziekenhuis Bethesda	Regional hospital		Hoogeveen	Drenthe	
Ziekenhuis Groep Twente (ZGT)	Training and Top hospital	Merger of Twenteborg ziekenhuis, Almelo and Streekziekenhuis Midden-Twente, Hengelo	Hengelo, Almelo	Overijssel	
Ziekenhuis Lievensberg	Regional hospital		Bergen op Zoom	Noord Brabant	
Ziekenhuis Sint Jansdal	Regional hospital		Harderwijk	Gelderland	
Ziekenhuis Velp	Regional hospital		Velp	Gelderland	
Ziekenhuis Zevenaar	Regional hospital		Zevenaar	Gelderland	
ZorgSaam Ziekenhuis	Regional hospital	De Honte-Terneuzen, Antonius-Oostburg, Liduina policlinic-Hulst; successor of independent hospitals Liduinaziekenhuis Hulst, Elisabethziekenhuis Sluiskil and Julianaziekenhuis Terneuzen	Zeeuws Vlaanderen	Zeeland	
Zuwe Hofpoort Ziekenhuis	Regional hospital		Woerden	Utrecht	
Zuyderland ziekenhuis	Training and Top hospital	Previously Atrium Medisch Centrum Parkstad	Heerlen	Limburg	
