= Karin E. de Visser =

Researcher at the Netherlands Cancer Institute

- Education: Netherlands Cancer Institute
- Scientific career
- Workplaces: Netherlands Cancer Institute; University of California, San Francisco
- Thesis: The impact of self-antigen expression on the CD8+ T cell repertoire : implications for anti-tumor immunity (2002)

Karina Elizabeth de Visser (Karin de Visser, 1975), also named "Karin E. de Visser", is a researcher at the Netherlands Cancer Institute. Her research considers metastatic formation and how the immune system influences how people respond to cancer treatment.

== Early life and education ==
In 1998 De Visser obtained her master's degree in Biomedical Science at Leiden University (cum laude). De Visser was a postgraduate student at the Netherlands Cancer Institute, supervised by prof. dr. Ada Kruisbeek. In 2002 she got her PhD degree at the Vrije Universiteit Amsterdam with her thesis The impact of self-antigen expression on the CD8+ T cell repertoire: Implications for anti-tumor immunity.

In 2003 she was appointed a postdoctoral fellow with Lisa Coussens at the University of California, San Francisco. Here she started working on the interaction between the adaptive and innate immune system. She spent two years in California, before returning to the Netherlands Cancer Institute where she started working on inflammation and carcinogenesis.

== Research and career ==
De Visser launched her independent career at the Netherlands Cancer Institute, where she started working on tumour biology and immunology. De Visser looks to understand how the immune system impacts the formation of metastasis and response to cancer treatment. In particular, De Visser has focussed on breast cancer, and how tumours can hijack the immune system to allow for metastatic spread. She also identified that the precise genetic make-up of breast cancer determines pro-metastatic inflammation.

She works closely with Marleen Kok on translation of her findings to clinical environments, including looking to understand the landscape of breast cancer patients treated with checkpoint inhibitors.

== Awards and honours ==
- 2014 European Research Council Consolidator Grant
- 2015 Beug Foundation Metastasis Research Prize
- 2016 Elected to the European Molecular Biology Organization
- 2019 Awarded a NWO-VICI grant
- 2021 Elected member of the European Molecular Biology Organization

== Select publications ==
- Visser, Karin de (2002). The impact of self-antigen expression on the CD8+ T cell repertoire: Implications for anti-tumor immunity. s.l.: s.n. OCLC 66167703.
- Karin E. de Visser; Eichten A; Lisa M. Coussens (January 2006). "Paradoxical roles of the immune system during cancer development". Nature Reviews Cancer. 6 (1): 24–37. doi:10.1038/nrc1782. ISSN 1474-175X. PMID 16397525. Wikidata Q29614305.
- Karin E. de Visser; Jos Jonkers (1 January 2009). "Towards understanding the role of cancer-associated inflammation in chemoresistance". Current Pharmaceutical Design. 15 (16): 1844–1853. doi:10.2174/138161209788453239. ISSN 1381-6128. OCLC 5524179038. PMID 19519427. Wikidata Q37515888.
- Seth B. Coffelt; Kelly Kersten; Chris W Doornebal; et al. (30 March 2015). "IL-17-producing γδ T cells and neutrophils conspire to promote breast cancer metastasis". Nature. 522 (7556): 345–348. doi:10.1038/nature14282. ISSN 1476-4687. PMC 4475637. PMID 25822788. Wikidata Q35763387.
- Seth B. Coffelt; Max D Wellenstein; Karin E. de Visser (10 June 2016). "Neutrophils in cancer: neutral no more". Nature Reviews Cancer. 16 (7): 431–446. doi:10.1038/nrc.2016.52. ISSN 1474-175X. PMID 27282249. Wikidata Q38860382.
