= Piet Borst =

Dutch biologist, molecular biologist and biochemist

Piet Borst CBE (born 5 July 1934, in Amsterdam) is emeritus professor of clinical biochemistry and molecular biology at the University of Amsterdam (UVA), and until 1999 director of research and chairman of the board of directors of the Netherlands Cancer Institute and the Antoni van Leeuwenhoekziekenhuis (NKI-AVL). He continued to work at the NKI-AVL as a staff member and group leader until 2016.

== Career ==
Piet Borst studied medicine in Amsterdam from 1952 to 1958 and completed his internships in 1961-1962. He received his PhD for an investigation of tumor mitochondria (Supervisor Edward Slater).

He then moved to New York City, where he worked with fellow post-doc Charles Weissmann on replication of bacteriophages in the lab of Nobel laureate Severo Ochoa at the New York University School of Medicine. In 1965, he became professor of Biochemistry at the University of Amsterdam and head of the section for Medical Enzymology and Molecular Biology of the Biochemistry Department. From 1972 to 1980 Borst was also part-time Director of the Institute of Animal Physiology of the University of Amsterdam where he set up the first Unit for Molecular Biology on the Biology Campus.

In 1983 Borst moved to the Netherlands Cancer Institute - Antoni van Leeuwenhoek Hospital where he became director of research and in 1987 also chairman. He retained an honorary professorship at the University of Amsterdam. After his mandatory retirement in 1999, Borst became a staff member and continued running his lab, studying mechanisms of chemotherapy resistance in cancer cells, the physiological functions of drug transporters and the biosynthesis and function of DNA Base J, a new base in DNA that had been discovered in trypanosomes by his research group.

Borst contributed to discussions about science and science policy in the Netherlands: In the seventies he was spokesman for science in the rather virulent discussions on recombinant-DNA experiments; as a director of the cancer institute he regularly reported on advances in cancer research/treatment in the press and on radio/TV; he was a member of the Innovation Platform, a small thinktank of the Dutch prime-minister; and for 23 years he wrote a monthly column in the prime intellectual daily, the NRC Handelsblad.

His doctoral students include Jan Hoeijmakers.

== Major international organisational functions ==
- 1978 – 1984 Elected member EMBO Council (1982 – 1984 vice-president)
- 1985 – 1991 Member of the Scientific Advisory Board of the EMBL in Heidelberg, Germany. (1988 – 1991 President)
- 1986 – 1990 Member of the Scientific Advisory Board of the Basel Institute for Immunology, Switzerland
- 1986 – 1993 Member of the Scientific Advisory Board of the Research Institute of Molecular Pathology, Vienna, Austria
- 1991 – 2004 Member of the Scientific Committee of the Foundation Louis Jeantet, Genève, de jury of the Louis Jeantet Prize (since 1997 President of the jury), Switzerland
- 1992 – 1998 Member of the Scientific Advisory Board of the Swiss Institute for Experimental Cancer Research (ISREC), Lausanne, Switzerland
- 1994 – 2000 Member of the Scientific Advisory Board of the Imperial Cancer Research Fund, Londen, GB
- 1999 – 2005 Member of the Scientific Advisory Board of the Zentrum für Molekulare Biologie, Heidelberg, Germany
- 2000 – 2005 Member of the External Scientific and Strategic Committee (CEOSS) of the Institute Pasteur, Paris, France (since 2004 also chairman)
- 2000 – 2006 Member Supervisory Board Schering A.G., Berlin, Germany
- 2004 – 2008 Chairman of the Scientific Advisory Board of the Fritz-Lipmann Institut, Jena, Germany
- 2005 – 2012 Member of the Scientific Advisory Board of the London Research Institute, London, United Kingdom
- 2005 – 2012 Member of the Board of Scientific Governors of The Scripps Research Institute, USA
- 2013 – 2016 Member of the Scientific Advisory Board of the European Research Institute for the Biology of Ageing (ERIBA), Groningen, The Netherlands

== Royal distinctions ==
- 1999 Commander in the Order of the Netherlands Lion
- 2007 Honorary Commander of the Order of the British Empire (CBE)

== Scientific awards ==
- 1981 Royal Dutch/Shell-prize for the Life Sciences (Netherlands)
- 1984 Paul-Ehrlich und Ludwig-Darmstaedter Prize, Germany (shared with Prof. George Cross)
- 1984 F.M.V.V. Prize of the Dutch Federation of Medical Scientific Societies
- 1989 Howard Taylor Ricketts Award of the University of Chicago, USA
- 1990 Dr. G. Wander award of the Wander Foundation in Bern, Switzerland
- 1990 Gold medal of the Genootschap voor Natuur-, Genees- en Heelkunde in Amsterdam
- 1992 Dr. H.P. Heineken prize for biochemistry and biophysics of the Royal Netherlands Academy of Sciences
- 1992 Gold medal of the Robert Koch Foundation in Cologne, Germany
- 1993 Prof.dr P. Muntendam prize of the Dutch Cancer Society
- 1999 Silver Medal of merit of the City of Amsterdam
- 1999 Medal of the University of Amsterdam for exceptional contributions to the university
- 2000 Hamilton Fairley Award for Clinical Research, European Society for Medical Oncology, Hamburg.
- 2007 The distinguished Service Award, awarded at the Miami Nature Biotechnology Winter Symposium, Miami Beach, Florida, USA.
- 2010 Gebroeders Bruinsma Erepenning van de Nederlandse Vereniging tegen de Kwakzalverij, Amsterdam.
- 2023 Lasker-Koshland Special Achievement Award in Medical Science.

== Membership of academics ==
- 1978 Royal Netherlands Academy of Arts and Sciences
- 1983 De Hollandsche Maatschappij der Wetenschappen
- 1986 Foreign Member of the Royal Society
- 1989 Academia Europaea
- 1991 Foreign Associate of the National Academy of Sciences, Washington, United States
- 1995 International Honorary Member of the American Academy of Arts and Sciences, United States
- 2009 Fellow of the European Academy of Cancer Sciences

== Discoveries of Borst and collaborators ==
1. The malate-aspartate shuttle (“Borst cycle”), a new major route for the transport of reducing equivalents from cytosol to mitochondria (1).
2. Bacteriophage RNA replicase keeps the template and daughter strand separated during RNA synthesis; duplex RNA is not an intermediate in RNA synthesis, but an isolation artifact (2).
3. Mammalian mitochondrial DNA consists of small duplex circles (3) that are identical in sequence, as proven by quantitative DNA renaturation experiments (4). It follows that the bulk of mitochondrial proteins is not encoded in mitochondrial DNA, but must be imported.
4. Development of ethidium-agarose electrophoresis (5) (for the separation of DNA topoisomers); proof that linear DNA molecules move like snakes through the gel (5).
5. The glycosome, a new peroxisome-like organelle that contains the glycolytic enzyme system in trypanosomes and related uni-cellular parasites (6).
6. Mitochondrial genes of the yeast Saccharomyces may contain introns (7) (8).
7. A DNA transposition mechanism for antigenic variation in African trypanosomes (9) (10) (11) (12).
8. Transsplicing as an essential step in the synthesis of all trypanosome mRNAs (13) (14) (15) (16, 17).
9. Growth and contraction of chromosome ends, the telomeres (18); trypanosome telomeres end in repeats of (GGGTTA)n (19) later also found in human telomeres.
10. Introduction of PFG electrophoresis for the separation of chromosome-sized DNA molecules of several protozoa (20) (21).
11. The first prenatal test for the Zellweger syndrome, a deadly inborn error of peroxisome biosynthesis (22).
12. Protective physiological functions of drug-transporting P-glycoproteins (ABCB1), i.a. in the blood-brain barrier (23) and in the gut (oral availability of drugs) (24) (25).
13. Proof that the Mdr2/MDR3 (ABCB4) P-glycoprotein is a phosphatidylcholine translocator, essential for bile formation (26).
14. Identification of the first ABC-transporter in a protozoal parasite, Leishmania, the PGP-A gene (now LtpgpA). This transporter gene is associated with arsenite resistance and is surrounded by direct and inverted DNA repeats facilitating gene amplification (27) (28) (29). This was the first representative of the ABCC class of transporters. Later Ouellette showed in his own lab that LtpgpA is an arsenite-GSH transporter involved in antimony resistance in patients.
15. J, a new base in the DNA of trypanosomes and related parasites (30) (31).
16. Variation in the transferrin receptor allows African trypanosomes to efficiently take up transferrin in a range of mammals, notwithstanding the rapid evolution of mammalian transferrins (32) (33).
17. Biosynthesis of base J (34) and identification of J as an essential termination signal in RNA synthesis in Leishmania (35).
18. The MRP (ABCC) family of drug transporters has multiple members (36) (37) (38). Identification of new endogenous substrates for MRP3 (ABCC3) and BCRP (ABCG2): phyto-estrogen conjugates (39) (40); MRP4 (ABCC4): prostaglandins (41); and MRP5 (ABCC5): N-lactoyl-amino acids, a novel metabolites of mammals (42), and glutamate-conjugates (43).
19. The first mouse tumor model suitable for studying mechanisms of primary and acquired resistance against drugs used to treat cancer patients (44) (45) (46).
20. Identification of new factors inhibiting DNA end resection, REV7 (47) and HELB (48), contributing to drug resistance in a mouse mammary tumor model.
21. Identification of the Volume-Regulation Anion Channel, as a contributor to uptake of Pt-based anti-cancer drugs in cells (49).
22. Pseudoxanthoma elasticum, an inborn error of calcification due to absence of MRP6 (ABCC6) in the liver, is caused by low plasma pyrophosphate (PPi). MRP6 mediates ATP export from cells and this is rapidly converted into PPi (binding calcium) by ectonucleotidases (50, 51).

=== Publications ===
1. Borst P. Hydrogen transport and transport metabolites. In: Karlsson P, editor. Springer Verlag. Funktionelle und morphologische Organisation der Zelle; 1963. Heidelberg1963. p. 137-62.
2. Borst P, Weissmann C. Replication of viral RNA, 8. Studies on the enzymatic mechanism of replication of MS2 RNA. Proc Natl Acad Sci U S A. 1965;54:982-7.
3. Van Bruggen EF, Borst P, Ruttenberg GJ, Gruber M, Kroon AM. Circular mitochondrial DNA. Biochim Biophys Acta. 1966;119:437-9.
4. Borst P, Ruttenberg GJ. Renaturation of mitochondrial DNA. Biochim Biophys Acta. 1966;114:645-7.
5. Aaij C, Borst P. The gel electrophoresis of DNA. Biochim Biophys Acta. 1972;269:192-200.
6. Opperdoes FR, Borst P. Localization of nine glycolytic enzymes in a microbody-like organelle in Trypanosoma brucei: the glycosome. FEBS Lett. 1977;80:360-4.
7. Heyting C, Meijlink FC, Verbeet MP, Sanders JP, Bos JL, Borst P. Fine structure of the 21S ribosomal RNA region on yeast mitochondria DNA. I. Construction of the physical map and localization of the cistron for the 21S mitochondrial ribosomal RNA. Molecular & General Genetics. 1979;168:231-46.
8. Bos JL, Osinga KA, Van der Horst G, Hecht NB, Tabak HF, Van Ommen GJ, Borst P. Splice point sequence and transcripts of the intervening sequence in the mitochondrial 21S ribosomal RNA gene of yeast. Cell. 1980;20:207-14.
9. Hoeijmakers JH, Frasch AC, Bernards A, Borst P, Cross GAM. Novel expression-linked copies of the genes for variant surface antigens in trypanosomes. Nature. 1980;284:78-80.
10. Boothroyd JC, Cross GA, Hoeijmakers JH, Borst P. A variant surface glycoprotein of Trypanosoma brucei synthesized with a C-terminal hydrophobic 'tail' absent from purified glycoprotein. Nature. 1980;288:624-6.
11. Bernards A, Van der Ploeg LH, Frasch AC, Borst P, Boothroyd JC, Coleman S, Cross GA. Activation of trypanosome surface glycoprotein genes involves a duplication-transposition leading to an altered 3' end. Cell. 1981;27:497-505.
12. De Lange T, Borst P. Genomic environment of the expression-linked extra copies of genes for surface antigens of Trypanosoma brucei resembles the end of a chromosome. Nature. 1982;299:451-3.
13. Van der Ploeg LH, Liu AY, Michels PA, De Lange TD, Borst P, Majumder HK, Weber H, Veeneman GH, Van Boom J. RNA splicing is required to make the messenger RNA for a variant surface antigen in trypanosomes. NAR. 1982;10:3591-604.
14. Kooter JM, De Lange T, Borst P. Discontinuous synthesis of mRNA in trypanosomes. EMBO J. 1984;3:2387-92.
15. De Lange T, Michels PA, Veerman HJ, Cornelissen AW, Borst P. Many trypanosome messenger RNAs share a common 5' terminal sequence. NAR. 1984;12:3777-90.
16. Kooter JM, Borst P. Alpha-amanitin-insensitive transcription of variant surface glycoprotein genes provides further evidence for discontinuous transcription in trypanosomes. NuclAcids Res. 1984;12:9457-72.
17. Laird PW, Kooter JM, Loosbroek N, Borst P. Mature mRNAs of Trypanosoma brucei possess a 5' cap acquired by discontinuous RNA synthesis. NAR. 1985;13:4253-66.
18. Bernards A, Michels PA, Lincke CR, Borst P. Growth of chromosome ends in multiplying trypanosomes. Nature. 1983;303:592-7.
19. Van der Ploeg LHT, Liu AYC, Borst P. Structure of the growing telomeres of Trypanosomes. Cell. 1984;36:459-68.
20. Van der Ploeg LH, Cornelissen AW, Michels PA, Borst P. Chromosome rearrangements in Trypanosoma brucei. Cell. 1984;39:213-21.
21. Van der Ploeg LH, Cornelissen AW, Barry JD, Borst P. Chromosomes of kinetoplastida. EMBO J. 1984;3:3109-15.
22. Heymans HS, Schutgens RB, Tan R, van den Bosch H, Borst P. Severe plasmalogen deficiency in tissues of infants without peroxisomes (Zellweger syndrome). Nature. 1983;306:69-70.
23. Schinkel AH, Smit JJM, Van Tellingen O, Beijnen JH, Wagenaar E, Van Deemter L, Mol CAAM, Van der Valk MA, Robanus-Maandag EC, Te Riele HPJ, Berns AJM, Borst P. Disruption of the mouse mdr1a P-glycoprotein gene leads to a deficiency in the blood-brain barrier and to increased sensitivity to drugs. Cell. 1994;77:491-502.
24. Mayer U, Wagenaar E, Beijnen JH, Smit JW, Meijer DKF, Van Asperen J, Borst P, Schinkel AH. Substantial excretion of digoxin via the intestinal mucosa and prevention of long-term digoxin accumulation in the brain by the mdr1a P-glycoprotein. Br J Pharmacol. 1996;119:1038-44.
25. Schinkel AH, Mayer U, Wagenaar E, Mol CAAM, Van Deemter L, Smit JJM, Van der Valk MA, Voordouw AC, Spits H, Van Tellingen O, Zijlmans JMJM, Fibbe WE, Borst P. Normal viability and altered pharmacokinetics in mice lacking mdr1-type (drug-transporting) P-glycoproteins. Proc Natl Acad Sci U S A. 1997;94:4028-33.
26. Smit JJM, Schinkel AH, Oude Elferink RPJ, Groen AK, Wagenaar E, Van Deemter L, Mol CAAM, Ottenhof R, Van der Lugt NMT, Van Roon M, Van der Valk MA, Offerhaus GJA, Berns AJM, Borst P. Homozygous disruption of the murine mdr2 P-glycoprotein gene leads to a complete absence of phospholipid from bile and to liver disease. Cell. 1993;75:451-62.
27. Crozatier M, Van der Ploeg LH, Johnson PJ, Gommers-Ampt J, Borst P. Structure of a telomeric expression site for variant specific surface antigens in Trypanosoma brucei. Molecular & Biochemical Parasitology. 1990;42:1-12.
28. Ouellette M, Hettema E, Wust D, Fase-Fowler F, Borst P. Direct and inverted DNA repeats associated with P-glycoprotein gene amplification in drug resistant Leishmania. EMBO J. 1991;10:1009-16.
29. Ouellette M, Borst P. Drug resistance and P-glycoprotein gene amplification in the protozoan parasite Leishmania. Res Microbiol. 1991;142:737-46.
30. Gommers-Ampt JH, Van Leeuwen F, de Beer AL, Vliegenthart JF, Dizdaroglu M, Kowalak JA, Crain PF, Borst P. beta-D-glucosyl-hydroxymethyluracil: a novel modified base present in the DNA of the parasitic protozoan T. brucei. Cell. 1993;75:1129-36.
31. Van Leeuwen F, Taylor MC, Mondragon A, Moreau H, Gibson W, Kieft R, Borst P. Beta-D-Glucosyl-hydroxymethyluracil is a conserved DNA modification in kinetoplastid protozoans and is abundant in their telomeres. Proc Natl Acad Sci U S A. 1998;95:2366-71.
32. Bitter W, Gerrits H, Kieft R, Borst P. The role of transferrin-receptor variation in the host range of Trypanosoma brucei. Nature. 1998;391:499-502.
33. Van Luenen HGAM, Kieft R, Mussmann R, Engstler M, ter Riet B, Borst P. Trypanosomes change their transferrin receptor expression to allow effective uptake of host transferrin. Mol Microbiol. 2005;58:151-65.
34. Yu Z, Genest PA, ter Riet B, Sweeney K, DiPaolo C, Kieft R, Christodoulou E, Perrakis A, Simmons JM, Hausinger RP, Van Luenen HGAM, Rigden DJ, Sabatini R, Borst P. The protein that binds to DNA base J in trypanosomatids has features of a thymidine hydroxylase. Nucleic Acids Res. 2007;35:2107-15.
35. van Luenen H, Farris C, Jan S, Genest P-A, Tripathi P, Velds A, Kerkhoven RM, Nieuwland M, Haydock A, Ramasamy G, Vainio S, Heidebrecht T, Perrakis A, Pagie L, van Steensel B, Myler P, Borst P. Glucosylated hydroxymethyluracil (DNA base J) prevents transcriptional read-through in Leishmania. Cell. 2012;150(5):909-21.
36. Kool M, De Haas M, Scheffer GL, Scheper RJ, Van Eijk MJT, Juijn JA, Baas F, Borst P. Analysis of expression of cMOAT (MRP2), MRP3, MRP4, and MRP5, homologs of the multidrug resistance-associated protein gene (MRP1), in human cancer cell lines. Cancer Res. 1997;57:3537-47.
37. Kool M, Van der Linden M, De Haas M, Scheffer GL, De Vree JML, Smith AJ, Jansen G, Peters GJ, Ponne N, Scheper RJ, Oude Elferink RPJ, Baas F, Borst P. MRP3, an organic anion transporter able to transport anti-cancer drugs. Proc Natl Acad Sci U S A. 1999;96:6914-9.
38. Wijnholds J, Mol CAAM, Van Deemter L, De Haas M, Scheffer GL, Baas F, Beijnen JH, Scheper RJ, Hatse S, De Clercq E, Balzarini J, Borst P. Multidrug-resistance protein 5 is a multispecific organic anion transporter able to transport nucleoside analogs. Proc Natl Acad Sci U S A. 2000;97:7476-81.
39. Van de Wetering K, Feddema W, Helms JB, Brouwers JF, Borst P. Targeted metabolomics identifies glucuronides of dietary phytoestrogens as a major class of MRP3 substrates in vivo. Gastroenterol. 2009;137:1725-35.
40. Krumpochova P, Sapthu S, Brouwers JF, De Haas M, de Vos R, Borst P, Van de Wetering K. Transportomics: screening for substrates of ABC transporters in body fluids using vesicular transport assays. FASEB J. 2012;26(2):738-47.
41. Reid G, Wielinga P, Zelcer N, Van der Heijden I, Kuil A, De Haas M, Wijnholds J, Borst P. The human multidrug resistance protein MRP4 functions as a prostaglandin efflux transporter and is inhibited by nonsteroidal antiinflammatory drugs. Proc Natl Acad Sci U S A. 2003;100(16):9244-9.
42. Jansen R AR, Merkx R, Fish A, Mahakena S, Bleijerveld O, Altelaar M, IJlst L, Wanders R, Borst P and Van de Wetering JK. N-lactoyl-amino acids are ubiquitous metabolites that originate from CNDP2-mediated reverse proteolysis of lactate and amino acids. Proc Natl Acad Sci U S A. 2015;112(21):6601-6.
43. Jansen RS, Mahakena S, de Haas M, Borst P, van de Wetering K. ATP-binding Cassette Subfamily C Member 5 (ABCC5) Functions as an Efflux Transporter of Glutamate Conjugates and Analogs. J Biol Chem. 2015;290(51):30429-40.
44. Rottenberg S, Nygren AOH, Pajic M, Van Leeuwen FWB, Van der Heijden I, Van de Wetering K, Liu X, de Visser KE, Gilhuijs KG, Van Tellingen O, Schouten JP, Jonkers J, Borst P. Selective induction of chemotherapy resistance of mammary tumors in a conditional mouse model for hereditary breast cancer. Proc Natl Acad Sci U S A. 2007;104:12117-22.
45. Rottenberg S, Jaspers J, Kersbergen A, Van der Burg E, Nygren AOH, Zander S, Derksen PW, de Bruin M, Zevenhoven J, Lau A, Boulter R, Cranston A, O'Connor MJ, Martin NMB, Borst P, Jonkers J. High sensitivity of BRCA1-deficient mammary tumors to the PARP inhibitor AZD2281 alone and in combination with platinum drugs. ProcNatl AcadSciUSA. 2008;105:17079-84.
46. Rottenberg S, Vollebergh MA, de Hoon B, de Ronde J, Schouten PC, Kersbergen A, Zander SA, Pajic M, Jaspers JE, Jonkers M, Loden M, Sol W, van der Burg E, Wesseling J, Gillet JP, Gottesman MM, Gribnau J, Wessels L, Linn SC, Jonkers J, Borst P. Impact of intertumoral heterogeneity on predicting chemotherapy response of BRCA1-deficient mammary tumors. Cancer Res. 2012;72(9):2350-61.
47. Xu G, Chapman JR, Brandsma I, Yuan J, Mistrik M, Bouwman P, Bartkova J, Gogola E, Warmerdam D, Barazas M, Jaspers JE, Watanabe K, Pieterse M, Kersbergen A, Sol W, Celie PH, Schouten PC, van den Broek B, Salman A, Nieuwland M, de Rink I, de Ronde J, Jalink K, Boulton SJ, Chen J, van Gent DC, Bartek J, Jonkers J, Borst P, Rottenberg S. REV7 counteracts DNA double-strand break resection and affects PARP inhibition. Nature. 2015;521(7553):541-4.
48. Tkac J, Xu G, Adhikary H, Young JT, Gallo D, Escribano-Diaz C, Krietsch J, Orthwein A, Munro M, Sol W, Al-Hakim A, Lin ZY, Jonkers J, Borst P, Brown GW, Gingras AC, Rottenberg S, Masson JY, Durocher D. HELB Is a Feedback Inhibitor of DNA End Resection. Mol Cell. 2016.
49. Planells-Cases R, Lutter D, Guyader C, Gerhards NM, Ullrich F, Elger DA, Kucukosmanoglu A, Xu G, Voss FK, Reincke SM, Stauber T, Blomen VA, Vis DJ, Wessels LF, Brummelkamp TR, Borst P, Rottenberg S, Jentsch TJ. Subunit composition of VRAC channels determines substrate specificity and cellular resistance to Pt-based anti-cancer drugs. EMBO J. 2015;34(24):2993-3008.
50. Jansen RS, Kucukosmanoglu A, de Haas M, Sapthu S, Otero JA, Hegman IE, Bergen AA, Gorgels TG, Borst P, van de Wetering K. ABCC6 prevents ectopic mineralization seen in pseudoxanthoma elasticum by inducing cellular nucleotide release. Proc Natl Acad Sci U S A. 2013;110(50):20206-11.
51. Jansen RS, Duijst S, Mahakena S, Sommer D, Szeri F, Varadi A, Plomp A, Bergen AA, Oude Elferink RP, Borst P, van de Wetering K. ABCC6-mediated ATP secretion by the liver is the main source of the mineralization inhibitor inorganic pyrophosphate in the systemic circulation-brief report. Arterioscler Thromb Vasc Biol. 2014;34(9):1985-9.
