= Lisa Coussens =

American cancer scientist and academic

- Education: University of California, Los Angeles; San Francisco State University
- Scientific career
- Workplaces: Oregon Health & Science University; University of California, San Francisco; Genentech
- Thesis: Regulation of junB expression by transforming growth factor-beta, adenovirus12-E1A, and by the retinoblastoma susceptibility gene product (1993)

Lisa M. Coussens is an American cancer scientist who is Professor and Chair of the Department of Cell, Developmental and Cancer Biology and Deputy Director for Basic and Translational Research in the Knight Cancer Institute at the Oregon Health & Science University. She served as 2022-2023 President of the American Association for Cancer Research.

== Early life and education ==
Coussens was an undergraduate student at San Francisco State University. She worked at Genentech, Inc. (1981-1988) with Axel Ullrich PhD researching growth factor receptors and cloned the HER2 proto-oncogene. She moved to the University of California, Los Angeles for her doctoral research, where she studied JUNB expression. She was a postdoctoral researcher working with Douglas Hanahan at the University of California, San Francisco where she used transgenic mouse models of multi-stage cancer progression and demonstrated that chronic inflammation is established in early cancers and subsequently drives tumor development. Her later research has identified critical immune-regulatory programs that represent cancer vulnerabilities that can be therapeutically targeted to slow cancer progression.

== Research and career ==
Coussens' research considers immune therapies for cancer treatment. To do this, she looks at how immune cells regulate aspects of tumor cell development and the role of leukocytes. She makes use of breast, HPV-associated squamous, pancreas and mesothelioma mouse cancer models, in combination with human cancer specimens, to identify immune-regulated pathways that may be susceptible to therapeutic targeting.

Coussens showed that some immune cells are hijacked to promote tumor growth and metastasis. She uncovered the intra-cellular communication processes which cause tumor cells to trigger CD4 T cells to recruit macrophages to early tumors. Macrophages are white blood cells that are usually involved with clearing debris, but produce epidermal growth factors when they are close to tumor cells, which promotes the proliferation and invasion of tumor cells. Her research has emphasized the need to understand the tumor microenvironment in understanding cancer progression. She showed that dying cancer cells release factors that induce a CD8^{+} T cell-mediated immune response against cancer.

In 2022, Coussens was elected President of the American Association for Cancer Research.

== Awards and honors ==
- 2001 American Association for Cancer Research Gertrude B. Elion Award
- 2012 AACR-Women in Cancer Research Charlotte Friend Memorial Lectureship
- 2015 National Cancer Institute 13th Rosalind E. Franklin Award
- 2018 Doctor in Medicine from the University of Buenos Aires
- 2018 12th AACR-Princess Takamatsu Memorial Lectureship
- 2018 Career Award from the European Academy of Tumor Immunology
- 2018 Susan G. Komen Brinker Award for Scientific Distinction in Basic Science
- 2018 Elected as Fellow of the American Association for the Advancement of Science
- 2019 Elected Fellow of the American Association for Cancer Research Academy
- 2022 Elected Fellow of the Academy of Immuno-Oncology (Society of Immunotherapy of Cancer (SITC))
- 2022 Elected President of the American Association for Cancer Research
- 2023 Elected Fellow of the National Academy of Sciences (USA)
- 2023 15th Margaret L Kripke Legend Award For Promotion of Women in Cancer Medicine and Cancer Science
- 2024 Elected Member of the National Academy of Medicine

== Selected publications ==
- Lisa M Coussens; Werb, Zena (2002). "Inflammation and cancer". Nature. 420 (6917): 860–7. doi:10.1038/nature01322. PMC 2803035. PMID 12490959. Wikidata Q24649640.
- de Visser, Karin; Eichten A; Coussens, Lisa (2006). "Paradoxical roles of the immune system during cancer development". Nature Reviews Cancer. 6 (1): 24–37. doi:10.1038/nrc1782. PMID 16397525. Wikidata Q29614305.
- Hanahan D; Coussens LM (2012). "Accessories to the crime: functions of cells recruited to the tumor microenvironment". Cancer Cell. 21 (3): 309–22. doi:10.1016/j.ccr.2012.02.022. PMID 22439926. Wikidata Q29620161.
- A Ullrich; L Coussens; J S Hayflick; et al. (1984). "Human epidermal growth factor receptor cDNA sequence and aberrant expression of the amplified gene in A431 epidermoid carcinoma cells". Nature. 309 (5967): 418–425. doi:10.1038/309418a0. PMID 6328312. Wikidata Q29616544.
- L. M. Coussens (2002). "Matrix Metalloproteinase Inhibitors and Cancer--Trials and Tribulations". Science. 295 (5564): 2387–2392. doi:10.1126/science.1067100. PMID 11923519. Wikidata Q29544430.
