= René Bernards =

Dutch cancer researcher (born 1953)

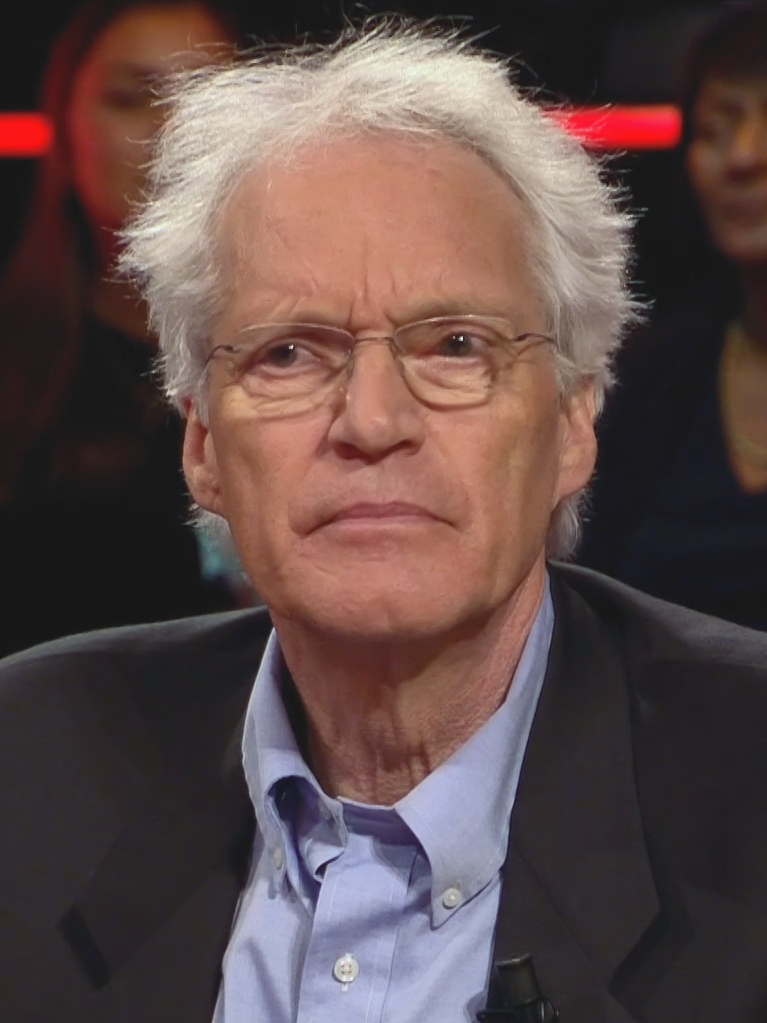
Bernards in 2018

René Bernards ForMemRS (born 4 January 1953) is a Dutch cancer researcher. He is professor of molecular carcinogenesis at Utrecht University and head of the section of molecular carcinogenesis at the Netherlands Cancer Institute-Antoni van Leeuwenhoekziekenhuis. Bernards is a winner of the 2005 Spinoza Prize.

== Career ==
Bernards was born in Bussum on 4 January 1953. He studied medical biology at the University of Amsterdam. Bernards subsequently obtained his PhD from Leiden University in 1984 under A.J. van der Eb with a thesis titled: Transformation and oncogenicity by human adenoviruses. He then moved to the United States and was a post doc under Robert Weinberg at the Whitehead Institute.

From 1988 to 1992 Bernards was an assistant professor at Harvard Medical School. He returned to the Netherlands in 1992 and became head of the section of molecular carcinogenesis at the Netherlands Cancer Institute-Antoni van Leeuwenhoekziekenhuis. Bernards was named part-time professor of molecular carcinogenesis at Utrecht University in 1994.

In 2003, he was co-founder of the biotechnology company Agendia, where he works as Chief Scientific Officer.

== Research ==
Bernards is known for his work on a personal, DNA-based, approach to cancer treatment. He has proposed more research in "escape routes" which tumors use, which prevent effective use of medication. He has helped in developing a test to predict the likelihood of recurrent metastatic breast cancer in patients, and the need for medical procedures, such as chemotherapy after surgery.

== Honors and distinctions ==
Bernards was elected a member of the European Molecular Biology Organization in 1995. Bernards was a winner of the Spinoza Prize in 2005. The awarding organisation, the Netherlands Organisation for Scientific Research, specified his "groundbreaking work in the molecular biology and diagnostics of cancer". In 2005, he was also elected a member of Academia Europaea. Bernards was elected a member of the Royal Netherlands Academy of Arts and Sciences in 2007.

In 2012, Bernards won the Koningin Wilhelmina Onderzoeksprijs by the Dutch Cancer Society, earning a 2 million euro subsidy. In 2013, he was named as recipient of the Royal Netherlands Academy of Arts and Sciences Academy Professor Prize, together with Wil Roebroeks. Bernards was elected a Fellow of the American Association for Cancer Research Academy in 2018. In 2019, he became an international honorary member of the American Academy of Arts and Sciences. In 2020 he was elected an international member of the National Academy of Sciences of the United States and became a foreign member of the Royal Society in 2024.
