= Nico van Zandwijk =

Dutch thoracic oncologist

- Born: Netherlands
- Education: University of Amsterdam (MD, PhD)
- Known for: Research on asbestos-related cancers and malignant pleural mesothelioma; leader of early clinical trials of microRNA-based therapies (TargomiRs)
- Awards: FRACP; FCCP
- Scientific career
- Fields: Thoracic oncology; mesothelioma; translational cancer research
- Workplaces: Netherlands Cancer Institute; Asbestos Diseases Research Institute (ADRI), University of Sydney; Royal Prince Alfred Hospital
- Thesis: Pulmonary Injury Elicited by Blood: An Experimental Study (1976)
- Doctoral advisor: Associate Professor A. S. Groen

Nico van Zandwijk is a Dutch-born thoracic oncologist and professor emeritus at the University of Sydney, recognized for his contributions to the study and treatment of asbestos-related diseases, particularly malignant pleural mesothelioma. He is a Fellow of the Royal Australasian College of Physicians, and a Fellow of the American College of Chest Physicians.

He has authored or co-authored over 300 peer-reviewed publications and book chapters, with more than 16,000 citations and an h-index of 68.

== Early life and education ==
van Zandwijk was born in the Netherlands. He trained in medicine and later earned a PhD from the University of Amsterdam, becoming a specialist in internal medicine and thoracic oncology. He obtained his medical degree from the University of Amsterdam in 1973 and received licences in internal medicine in 1979 and in pulmonary medicine in 1981.

He received his doctorate from the Faculty of Medicine of the University of Amsterdam on 26 February 1976, with a thesis titled Pulmonary Injury Elicited by Blood: An Experimental Study, supervised by A. S. Groen. In 1981, he became an assistant professor at the Academic Medical Centre and a consultant physician at the Netherlands Cancer Institute in Amsterdam.

His early career was based in the Netherlands, where he began working in thoracic oncology before founding the Department of Thoracic Oncology at the Netherlands Cancer Institute (Antoni van Leeuwenhoekhuis) in 1985, where he served until 2008.

== Career ==
He was secretary (1982 to 1988) and later chair of the European Organisation for Research and Treatment of Cancer (EORTC) Lung Cancer Cooperative Group from 1988 to 1994, and was a board member of the International Association for the Study of Lung Cancer (IASLC) from 2005 to 2009. He also served on the external advisory board for thoracic oncology at the Gustave Roussy Institute in Paris, and the advisory board of the Thoracic Oncology Section of the French National Cancer Institute. In 2002, he chaired the State Committee on Asbestos and Lung Cancer of the National Health Council of the Netherlands. He was co-chair of the 14th World Conference on Lung Cancer, held in Amsterdam in July 2011.

In 2008, van Zandwijk moved to Australia to become the inaugural director of the Asbestos Diseases Research Institute (ADRI) at Concord Hospital in Sydney. He directed the institute until 2017, when he received emeritus status. He was a founding member of the Australian Mesothelioma Registry a national registry of all new mesothelioma cases and the asbestos exposure histories of patients, which was relaunched in 2010.

In February 2010, ADRI, under van Zandwijk’s directorship, convened a multidisciplinary working party of Australian experts to develop national clinical practice guidelines for malignant pleural mesothelioma. The resulting Guidelines for the Diagnosis and Treatment of Malignant Pleural Mesothelioma were published by ADRI in July 2013. The chief executive officer of the National Health and Medical Research Council (NHMRC) approved the guidelines on 2 July 2013, stating that they met the NHMRC standard for clinical practice guidelines; the approval was valid for five years. A version of the guidelines was published in the Journal of Thoracic Disease later that year, listing 19 authors with van Zandwijk as first author. Van Zandwijk was a lead expert in drafting the guidelines.

After stepping down as ADRI director, he was appointed senior staff specialist with the Sydney Local Health District and honorary staff member at the Department of Cell and Molecular Therapies, Royal Prince Alfred Hospital. He coordinates clinical trial development for the Sydney Local Health District. He is involved in early-phase clinical trials of microRNA mimics and CAR T cells in patients with malignant pleural mesothelioma.

== Research ==
Van Zandwijk’s work spans translational cancer research and clinical trials. His research has focused on thoracic cancers, asbestos-related diseases and microRNA-based therapies. Notable projects include the EUROSCAN chemoprevention study, a 2017 phase I trial of microRNA-loaded minicells for malignant pleural mesothelioma, and an article on the therapeutic potential of synthetic microRNA mimics, as well as several articles on the global burden of asbestos-related cancers and mesothelioma epidemiology.

EUROSCAN was a randomised chemoprevention trial in patients with head and neck cancer or lung cancer, most of whom had a history of smoking. Between June 1988 and July 1994, 2,592 patients were assigned to receive retinyl palmitate, N-acetylcysteine, both, or no intervention. Van Zandwijk was first author of the report, published in 2000, which found no benefit from two years of supplementation with either agent in terms of survival, event-free survival or second primary tumours.

In a first-in-man, open-label, phase 1 trial at three cancer centres in Sydney, patients with recurrent malignant pleural mesothelioma that had progressed after chemotherapy received TargomiRs, minicells loaded with a miR-16-based microRNA mimic and targeted to the epidermal growth factor receptor (EGFR). The trial closed to patient entry on 3 January 2017 and was registered as NCT02369198. Van Zandwijk was first author of the report, published in The Lancet Oncology in October 2017. According to a commentary on the study, 26 patients received at least one dose, the maximum tolerated dose was 5 × 10⁹ TargomiRs once weekly, and one of 22 patients had an objective response lasting 32 weeks. A summary in The ASCO Post reported response and stable disease in 5% and 68% of patients respectively, with cardiac events in 19%. The authors concluded that the acceptable safety profile and early signs of activity supported further studies of TargomiRs in combination with chemotherapy or immune checkpoint inhibitors. The commentary by Viteri and Rosell described the study as the first use of a microRNA-based therapy in patients with pleural mesothelioma and as showing an acceptable safety profile and promising activity that merited further trials.

In a 2025 paper in Cancer Gene Therapy, Reid, van Zandwijk and colleagues described synthetic microRNA mimics designed from a consensus sequence of the miR-15/107 group of microRNAs. In laboratory studies, the mimics inhibited the growth of mesothelioma cells more than a mimic based on the native miR-16 sequence, and EGFR-targeted nanocells loaded with the mimic inhibited tumour growth in xenograft models of mesothelioma and non-small cell lung cancer.

Van Zandwijk has also published reviews and commentaries on asbestos-related cancers. A 2020 review in Expert Review of Anticancer Therapy, written with Glen Reid and Arthur L. Frank, examined the underreporting of mesothelioma and asbestos-related lung cancer and concluded that the number of people affected is likely to remain high. He was lead author of a 2022 article in The Lancet Oncology on the mesothelioma epidemic and, with Frank, of a 2024 editorial in Lung Cancer on asbestos-related lung cancer. In 2026 he co-authored an important article highlighting the carcinogenic risks of exposure to environmental asbestos.

== Selected publications ==
- van Zandwijk N et al. (2000). "EUROSCAN, a randomized trial of vitamin A and N-acetylcysteine". J Natl Cancer Inst.
- van Zandwijk N et al. (2013). "Guidelines for the diagnosis and treatment of malignant pleural mesothelioma". J Thorac Dis.
- van Zandwijk N et al. (2017). "Safety and activity of microRNA-loaded minicells in mesothelioma". Lancet Oncology.
- van Zandwijk N, Reid G, Frank A (2020). "Asbestos-related cancers: the ‘Hidden Killer’ remains a global threat". Expert Review of Anticancer Therapy.
- van Zandwijk N et al. (2022). "The silent malignant mesothelioma epidemic: a call to action". Lancet Oncology.
- van Zandwijk N, Frank A (2024). "A multidisciplinary review of asbestos-related lung cancer". Lung Cancer.
- Reid G & van Zandwijk (2025). “Therapeutic potential of synthetic microRNA mimics based on the miR-15/107 consensus sequence”. Cancer Gene Therapy.
