= Agathe L. van Beverwijk =

Dutch mycologist and botanist

- Born: 11 September 1907
- Died: 10 July 1963 (aged 55)
- Occupation: mycologist
- Known for: Centraalbureau voor Schimmelcultures

Agathe Louise van Beverwijk (11 September 1907 – 10 July 1963) was a Dutch mycologist and botanist. She spent most of her career at the Centraalbureau voor Schimmelcultures, where she was director from 1958 until her death in 1963.

== Biography ==
Agathe Louise van Beverwijk was born in Amsterdam in 1907. The eldest of two children, she grew up in the city centre of Amsterdam. She attended the University of Amsterdam from 1925 until 1930 and studied biology, focusing on the fields of botany, zoology and geology. After graduating, she took up a role as a biology teacher at a secondary school, and left after a few years to perform research on tissue culture at the Netherlands Cancer Institute in Amsterdam. She was opposed to the animal experimentation that her role required, however, and so she left the position.

Agathe was also very interested in languages, so after leaving the Netherlands Cancer Institute she spent a year studying English after which she receiving her diploma in teaching. With this, she began teaching Biology in english at the International Quakers' School in Ommen. During her time there, she got the opportunity to study several foreign languages.

In 1944, when the International Quakers' School closed during the war, van Beverwijk moved to Baarn, where she worked for the Centraalbureau voor Schimmelcultures (Central Bureau of Fungal Cultures). Initially she assisted and collaborated with the institute's director, Johanna Westerdijk, but van Beverwijk remained there for the rest of her career and was herself appointed director in 1958. She worked largely in the identification of fungi in the genera Fusarium, Pythium and Phytophthora. Her main interest was in an aero-aquatic subtype of oomycetes, and she published numerous papers about these species. One species, Vanbeverwijkia spirospora, was named after her in 1961 by V. V. Agnihothrudu in recognition of her contributions to the understanding of helicosporous Hyphomycetes. French mycologist Grégoire L. Hennebert named Spirosphaera beverwijkiana in her honour.

Van Beverwijk was a member of the British Mycological Society and the Mycological Society of America. She studied for two months in 1946 at the International Mycological Institute in Kew, and spent time in Paris in 1948 studying under Maurice Langeron and Emile Rivalier. She toured mycological institutions in the United States in 1957.

Van Beverwijk died in 1963 while holidaying in the Austrian Alps.

The standard author abbreviation Beverw. is used to indicate this person as the author when citing a botanical name.

== See also ==
- List of mycologists
