= University Medical Center Groningen =

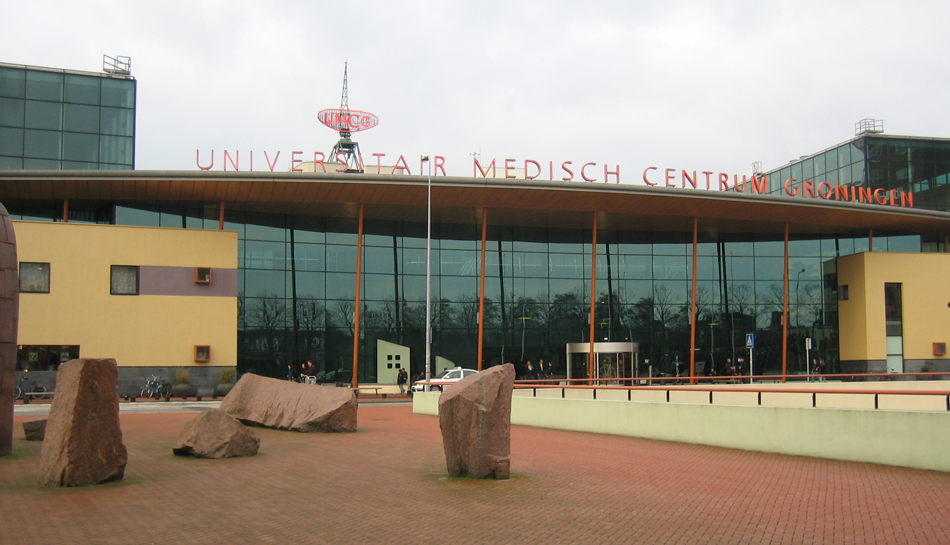

Geography
- Location: Groningen, Netherlands
- Coordinates: 53°13′21″N 6°34′26″E

Services
- Emergency department: Level I trauma center
- Beds: 1400

History
- Opened: 1997

Links
- Website: www.umcg.nl
- Lists: Hospitals in Netherlands

The University Medical Center Groningen (UMCG, Dutch: Universitair Medisch Centrum Groningen), formerly Groningen University Hospital, is the main hospital in Groningen, Netherlands.

The medical centre is affiliated with the University of Groningen and offers supraregional tertiary care to the northern part of the Netherlands. It employs almost 17,000 people and numbers almost 1400 beds. It is located in the centre of Groningen. It is also one of the largest centres for transplant surgery in the world. Organ transplant operations of all possible kinds are carried out at the UMCG, including combined transplants of multiple organs in one operation.

The main building was opened in 1997. Its design theme is based on light and air, and its 32 elevators each have a different theme. Art plays an important role in the hospital, with several exhibitions, statues, and a big fountain in the centre of the hospital. The UMCG contains several shops, including two coffee shops, a restaurant, a minimart, a candy & card store, a travel agency, a barber, a bookstore, a library for patients, and a Rituals flagship store. The ground floor is designed so that visitors do not feel as if they are in a hospital - the space is airy, there is a lot of green, and the glass roofs are opened when the weather is fair. Patient wards are on the outside of the building, so that all rooms have windows with a view. Each ward has a balcony that opens to one of the main 'streets' of the hospital. The operating centre, intensive care units, and staff rooms are in the central part of the building. At four stories in height, the UMCG does not rise above the surrounding city.

Special units include:

- Cardiothoracic surgery (including transplants)
- European Research Institute for the Biology of Ageing
- Level I trauma center (including trauma helicopter)
- Liver, kidney and bowel transplant surgery
- Neonatal and pediatric surgery and intensive care
- Neurosurgery
- Pediatric oncology

== Buildings ==
The buildings of the UMCG are designed with the idea that the buildings and the surroundings that patients stay in can help with the healing process. The buildings are also built a 'City within the city' concept: by bringing the outside in, patients are able to continue to participate in society. This is why the hospital has brought the outside world into its walls, including a bookshop, a hairdresser, a chemist, a pharmacy, cafés, and a travel agency.
