= Institute of Nanoscopy =

Dutch research institute

The Institute of Nanoscopy is a research institute of Maastricht University established in 2014 that investigates cell structures at a macromolecular level. The institute was founded by Peter J. Peters, distinguished professor of nanobiology at Maastricht University, who is also the institute's current director.

To understand the working mechanisms of protein complexes within cells, three-dimensional imaging of normal and disease-causing protein complexes is essential. The Institute also develops methods to capture the cell in close to native state and image whole cells and tissue slices down to 1 nanometer resolution. This way maps of individual macromolecular complexes can be created by visualizing nanomachines in a close-to-physiological, cellular context.

The institute's key objective is to gain greater insight into the 3D form of cell proteins, thus paving the way for the development of more effective treatments for diseases such as cancer and tuberculosis. A better understanding of how protein complexes manage healthy, but also diseased, cells will lead to scientific breakthroughs in the treatment of tuberculosis and cancer and allow drugs and vaccines to target problems more effectively.
