= Max Planck Institute for Biology of Ageing =

Non-profit research institute in Germany

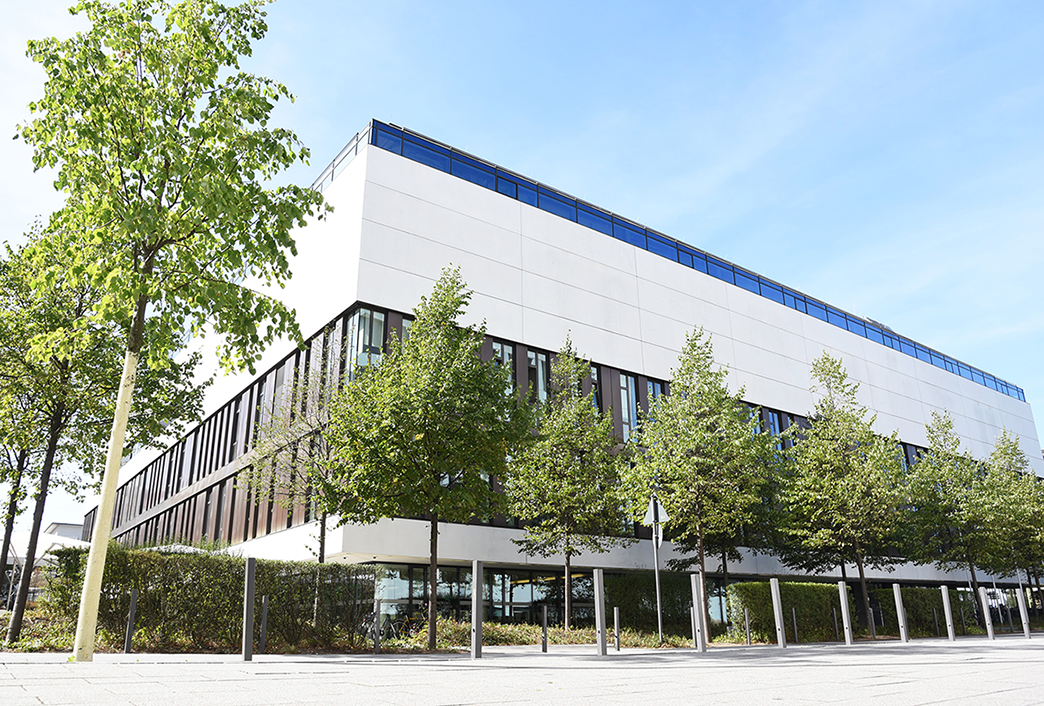
- Max Planck Institute for Biology of Ageing, Cologne
- Type: Institute for basic biomedical research
- Headquarters: Munich
- Location: Cologne
- Board of directors: Adam Antebi, Thomas Langer, and Anne Schaefer
- Parent organization: Max Planck Society
- Budget: Public funding (plus third party funding)
- Staff: 320
- Website: www.age.mpg.de

The Max Planck Institute (MPI) for Biology of Ageing, founded in 2008, is one of over 80 independent, non-profit-making institutes set up under the umbrella of the Max Planck Society. The overall research aim is to obtain fundamental insights into the aging process and thus to pave the way towards healthier aging in humans. An international research team drawn from almost 40 nations is working to uncover underlying molecular, physiological and evolutionary mechanisms.

Located on the campus of Cologne University Hospital, this MPI forms a substantial part of a regional Life Science Cluster of closely interlinked research organizations focusing on research into ageing and ageing-associated diseases. Regional partners include the MPI for Metabolism Research and the Cluster of Excellence CECAD (both in Cologne) as well as the DZNE and the Max Planck Institute for Neurobiology of Behavior (both in Bonn).

Together with their regional, national and international partners, such as ERIBA, researchers at the MPI for Biology of Ageing are exploring how cells age throughout the course of their life, which genes are involved and to what extent environmental factors play a role. Underlying processes are being studied in so-called model organisms: The genes of the mouse Mus musculus, the fruit fly Drosophila melanogaster and the roundworm Caenorhabditis elegans are known and the life expectancy of these organisms is relatively short. This makes them particularly suitable for research into the ageing process. Further model organisms in the form of the African turquoise killifish Nothobranchius furzeri and the yeast Saccharomyces cerevisiae are in use. The studies on model organisms are in the long term to be linked with comparative studies in humans. The MPI is studying samples from patients in the clinic and conducting studies of long-lived families.

Since the beginning of the research work in 2008 Adam Antebi (US), Nils-Göran Larsson (Sweden) and Linda Partridge (UK) had been jointly directing the institute. In 2018 Thomas Langer (Germany) was appointed as the fourth director of the institute. The Larsson Department has since resigned from the institute. Anne Schaefer (Germany) was appointed as a Director in 2021. In 2023 Linda Partridge retired.

The foundation stone for the new research premises was laid in 2010 and the building was inaugurated in 2013.

As one of the youngest institutes of the Max Planck Society, the MPI for Biology of Ageing is expanding further and should eventually have a staff of about 350. At least ten research groups are planned as well as a fourth department under the leadership of a further director.

== Departments ==
- Molecular Genetics of Ageing (Adam Antebi)
- Mitochondrial Proteostasis (Thomas Langer)
- Neurobiology of Ageing (Anne Schaefer)

== Research Groups ==
- Genetics and Biomarkers of Human Ageing (Joris Deelen / Research Group)
- Cell Growth Control in Health and Age-related Disease (Constantinos Demetriades / Max Planck Research Group)
- Mechanisms of DNA Repair (Ron Jachimowicz / Max Planck Research Group)
- ADP-ribosylation in DNA repair and ageing (Ivan Matic / Research Group)
- Genome Instability and Ageing (Stephanie Panier / Max Planck Research Group)
- Metabolism of Infection (Lena Pernas/ Max Planck Research Group)
- Systems Biology of Ageing (Zak Frentz/ Max Planck Research Group)
- RNA-Binding Proteins in Metabolism and Ageing (Ina Huppertz/ Max Planck Research Group)
- Neuroimmunology of Ageing (Hannah Scheiblich/ Max Planck Research Group)

== Former Research Groups ==
- Skin Homeostasis and Ageing (Sara Wickström / Max Planck Research Group), moved to Helsinki University, and is now appointed a director at the Max Planck Institute for Molecular Biomedicine.
- Genome Evolution and Ageing (Jim Stewart/ Research Group), moved to the Biosciences Institute, Newcastle University.
- Evolutionary and Experimental Biology of Ageing (Dario Riccardo Valenzano/ Max Planck Research Group), moved to the Leibniz Institute on Aging.
- Metabolic and Genetic Regulation of Ageing (Martin Denzel / Research Group), moved to Altos Labs
- Autophagy Regulation (Martin Graef / Max Planck Research Group), moved to Cornell University
- Chromatin und Alterung (Max-Planck-Forschungsgruppe Peter Tessarz), moved to Radboud University

The "Max Planck Research Groups" offer young postdoctoral researchers the opportunity to qualify for a further career in research. Their leaders are appointed by the President of the Max Planck Society and enjoy independent status within an MPI, similar to that of the directors.

== Cologne Graduate School of Ageing Research ==
The Cologne Graduate School of Ageing Research was established in 2013 as a joint venture of the Graduate School of the Cologne Excellence Cluster on Aging and Aging-Associated Diseases(CECAD Graduate School) and the International Max Planck Research School for Ageing (IMPRS AGE). Associated institutes are the Cluster of Excellence - Cellular Stress Responses in Aging-Associated Diseases (CECAD), the Max Planck Institute for Biology of Ageing, the Max Planck Institute for Metabolism Research, the University of Cologne and the University Hospital of Cologne. The Graduate School offers exceptionally talented junior research scientists from all over the world the opportunity to obtain their doctorate in the field of ageing research within a four-year structured programme. Application requires a Master's degree (or equivalent) and is open annually in summer/autumn. The doctoral degrees are awarded by the University of Cologne. Since 2019, the Cologne Graduate School of Ageing Research has offered a Master Fellowship programme. This programme awards up to 5 Master fellowships per year to excellent students who are particularly interested in the field of ageing research. Applications for the Master Fellowship programme are possible every year in spring/summer. Students complete their Master's degree in one of the University of Cologne's Master programmes in 'Biological Sciences' or 'Biochemistry and Molecular Medicine'.
