= Peter J. Peters =

Dutch academic

Peter J. Peters (born 22 August 1957) is a professor of nanobiology and a distinguished university professor at Maastricht University. Peters is best known for his work in electron microscopy (EM) and cellular immunology. He is the founder and director of the Institute of Nanoscopy.

== Early life and education ==
Peters was born in Hunsel, the Netherlands in 1957. The eldest of six children, he often accompanied his father—a farmer—on errands. On one such visit to a local artificial insemination station, Peters discovered a keen interest in science.

Peters obtained his PhD in 1991 from Utrecht University. His PhD thesis, "Cellular immunology at the subcellular level", was completed under the guidance of Hans Geuze, Jannie Borst, and Hidde Ploegh. During this time, he studied the ultrastructure and trafficking of MHC class II molecules, as well as how the role of secretory granules in T-cell function. Following his PhD, Peters completed a postdoctoral fellowship at the National Institutes of Health in the laboratory of Richard Klausner, where he studied the regulation of endocytosis.

== Career ==
From 1994 to 1998, Peters worked at Utrecht University. He then moved on to the Netherlands Cancer Institute, where he worked from 1998 to 2013. There his group focused on sorting within the eukaryotic cell endomembrane system, primarily using cryo immunogold-electron microscopy. In 2014, Peters was appointed professor of nanobiology and co-director of the Maastricht Multimodal Molecular Imaging Institute at Maastricht University.

Since 1988, Peters has collaborated with Hans Clevers, working to establish human tissue organoids from stem cells in order to study the origin and mechanism of cancer and infection.

Peters’s current research goal is to devise a way of doing cryo-electron tomography in order to give a 3D view of a cell’s internal structure. His research group under M4I’s Division of Nanoscopy studies the 3D structure of an important component of the nanomachinery in bacteria causing tuberculosis.

== Other professional activities ==
Peters hold patents for three inventions, with a fourth filed and pending. One of his innovations resulted in a commercial product used in EM, currently sold by Leica Microsystems.

Peters is a member of the American Society of Cell Biology and the European Society of Microscopy. In 2016, he was elected to the Netherlands Academy of Technology and Innovation. He has frequently chaired international conferences and symposia, most recently the 19th International Microscopy Conference in Sydney, Australia in 2018.

Peters founded the Netherlands Postdoc Career Development Initiative (PDCI) in 1998 and served as its dean until 2002. PDCI was highlighted in the international press, in Cell, The Scientist, and Nature. Peters was editor of the journal Microscopy (formerly the Journal of Electron Microscopy) from 2008 to 2012.

In 2009, Peters was invited by the Society of Histochemistry to deliver the Robert Feulgen lecture.

In 2010–2011, Peters led the initiative and coordinated the establishment of the Netherlands Centre for Electron Nanoscopy, a Dutch national research infrastructure.

== Publications ==
Peters has published over 125 papers that have been cited over 24,000 times. His Hirsch index is 69.
