= Maastricht UMC+ =

Coordinates: 50°50′05″N 5°42′52″E

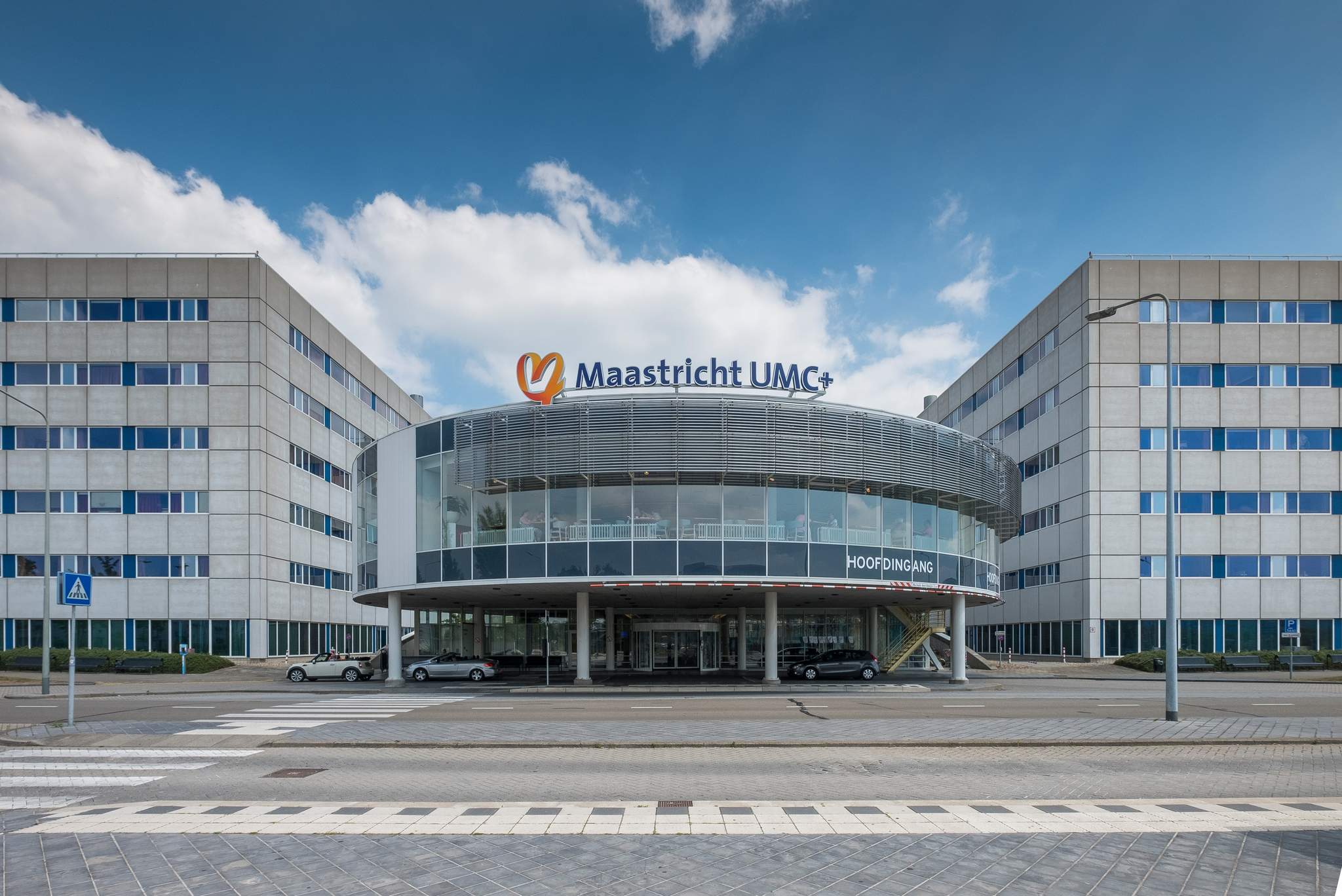
- Main entrance

Geography
- Location: Maastricht, Netherlands

Organisation
- Type: University hospital
- Affiliated university: Maastricht University
- Network: Netherlands Federation of University Medical Centres

Services
- Emergency department: Yes, Level I Trauma Center
- Beds: 715

Helipads
- Helipad: Yes

History
- Founded: 1991

Links
- Website: www.mumc.nl
- Lists: Hospitals in Netherlands

Maastricht University Medical Center+ (formerly known as Academic Hospital Maastricht ) or Maastricht UMC+ is an academic hospital in the city of Maastricht (Netherlands) and affiliated with Maastricht University. Maastricht UMC+ is one of the eight university medical centers in the Netherlands and is part of Netherlands Federation of University Medical Centres (NFU)

== Facts and figures ==
In 1991 the academic hospital Maastricht was founded in Maastricht. Since 2008 the Faculty, Health, Medicine and Life Sciences of Maastricht University and the academic hospital Maastricht cooperate under the name of Maastricht UMC+.

In 2016 Maastricht UMC+ had:

- 715 beds, including 60 intensive-care beds, 10 of which are in the pediatric IC unit and 23 in the neonatology IC unit
- 26 operating rooms
- 27,436 admissions
- 194,934 nursing days
- 22,722 day treatments
- 453,908 outpatient consultations
- 7,593 employees

== General information ==
Maastricht UMC+ has three core tasks: healthcare, scientific research and education. The '+' in the name refers to the special focus towards prevention and health promotion. Maastricht UMC+ has four profile areas, these are:

- cardiovascular disease
- respiratory disease
- oncology
- brain and nervous disorders

== Miscellaneous ==
Maastricht UMC+ is the only center in the Netherlands where preimplantion genetic diagnosis may be carried out. This is a technique to prevent severe genetic disorders in unborn children. Preimplantation genetic diagnosis can be performed for several genetic disorders, including Huntington's disease, cystic fibrosis and hereditary breast and ovarian cancer.

MAASTRO Clinic is a specialized clinic for radiation therapy and affiliated with Maastricht UMC+.
