= Adam Antebi =

German molecular biologist

Adam Antebi (born 1961) is an American-born molecular biologist performing research on fundamental mechanisms underlying the processes of aging and longevity. He currently serves as a director of the Max Planck Institute for Biology of Ageing in Cologne, Germany. Antebi has performed research on the molecular mechanisms regulating life span, particularly in model organisms such as C. elegans and the turquoise killifish.

== Education ==
Antebi received his bachelor's degree with distinction in biochemistry from Swarthmore College, Pennsylvania, in 1983. He went on to pursue his doctorate at the Massachusetts Institute of Technology (MIT) in the lab of Dr. Gerald Fink, completing his PhD in biology in 1991.

== Career ==
Following his PhD, Antebi conducted postdoctoral research at Johns Hopkins University Baltimore, MD under the mentorship of Dr. Edward M. Hedgecock. During this period, he began his research on pathways regulating C. elegans developmental timing and longevity, establishing a foundation for his later work.

From 1997, Antebi worked as a Max Planck independent group leader at the Max Planck Institute for Molecular Genetics, Berlin. In 2004, he became an assistant professor at the Baylor College of Medicine in Houston, Texas, where he advanced to associate professor in 2007.

In 2008, he joined the Max Planck Institute for Biology of Ageing as one of the founding directors, where he has since focused on understanding the molecular underpinnings of aging and longevity. Since 2010, he is also an honorary professor at the University of Cologne, Center of Excellence Cluster on Cellular Stress Responses and Ageing-Associated Disease.

Antebi's work has identified several regulatory pathways—such as steroidal, insulin/IGF, mTOR, microRNA and AMPK signaling—that play a role in maintaining cellular homeostasis and regulating life span. His work includes the regulation of animal life span by components of hormone driven developmental clocks, the effect of nutrients and metabolism on life span, and identifying small nucleoli as a cellular hallmark of longevity across taxa.

Throughout his career, Antebi has contributed to the organization of major conferences and symposia, including the Gordon Research Conference on the Biology of Aging and Cold Spring Harbor Asia Aging Conferences. He has held roles as a scientific advisory board (SAB) member for multiple institutions and organizations in Europe and worldwide. He helped establish the Systems Biology of Ageing Network, Cologne and served 16 years as an editor-in-chief for the scientific journal Aging Cell, shaping the field of biogerontology research.

Antebi served as the director of the International Max Planck Research School, Ph.D. Program and helped establish the Cologne Graduate School of Ageing Research Ph.D. Program, for which he served as a Co-Director from 2013 to 2022.

== Awards and honors ==
Antebi received the Breakthroughs in Gerontology Award from the American Federation for Aging Research/Glenn Foundation for Medical Research (2005), the DeBakey Excellence in Research Award from Baylor College of Medicine (2007), the Allianz/Associations de Prevoyance Sante (ADPS) Longevity Research Award (2016), and the Bennett J. Cohen Research in Aging Award (2021). He also held the Runnström Lecture, Wenner-Gren Institute, University of Stockholm, Sweden (2009).

From 2007 to 2012, Antebi was an Ellison Medical Foundation Senior Scholar in Aging. He is an elected a member of the European Molecular Biology Organization (EMBO) since 2016 and of the Academy of Health and Lifespan Research since 2022.

Antebi was awarded the European Research Council (ERC) Advanced Grant for his research on nucleolar functions in aging in 2019, and the Longevity Impetus Grant for targeting the nucleolus for phenotypic screens to discover lifespan extending drugs in 2023.
