= Nils-Göran Larsson =

Swedish professor and biologist

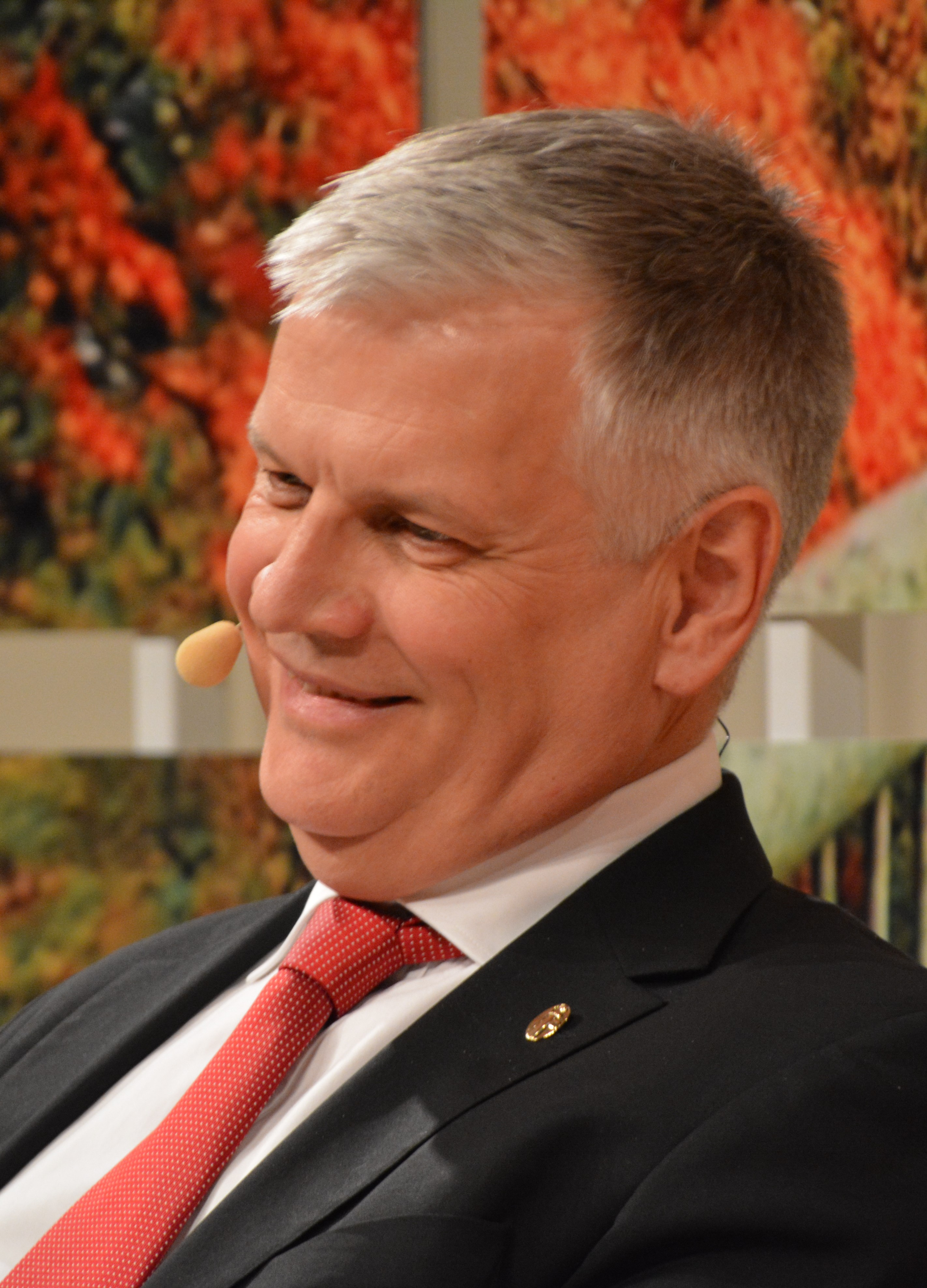
Nils-Göran Larsson

Nils-Göran Larsson is a Swedish professor specializing in mitochondrial biology.

== Career ==
Larsson started his career in 1987, focusing on the study of mitochondrial DNA (mtDNA) mutations related to human disease. During the early 1990s, Larsson identified gaps in the understanding of mitochondrial function, prompting him to further his specialization in biochemistry and mouse genetics at Stanford University as a HHMI Physician Postdoctoral Fellow in 1994.

From July 2002 until December 2015, Larsson was a professor in mitochondrial genetics at the Center for Inborn Errors of Metabolism at Karolinska Institutet and Karolinska University Hospital.

In 2008, Larsson joined the Max Planck Institute for Biology of Ageing in Cologne, Germany, as one of its founding directors, where he continued his research on mitochondrial dysfunction. He was also affiliated to Karolinska Institutet until 2015.

In 2016, Larsson returned to lead the Department of Medical Biochemistry and Biophysics. He has been an external member of the Max Planck Society since 2019. He is also a member of Nobel Prize committee.

== Awards and recognition ==
- 2002: Göran Gustafsson Prize in Medicine
- 2004: Descartes Prize from the European Union
- 2006: Jubilee Prize from the Swedish Medical Society
- 2008: Hilda and Alfred Erikssons Prize
