= Everina Borst =

Belgian radio personality

Everina Johanna Borst (1888-1943, known as Moeder Sarov, married name Ruth Sarphatie) was a Belgian radio personality. She was known as "Mother Sarov" for her children's broadcasts on the radio station Socialistische Arbeiders Radio-Omroep voor Vlaanderen (SAROV) in the 1930s. She was a member of the Jewish Ladies Auxiliary of Antwerp and a nurse in the local hospital.

Everina Borst was born on 18 January 1888 at Kraliningen near to Rotterdam in The Netherlands and married Gabriël Sarphatie, a Jewish diamond merchant, on 4 October 1917, taking the name Ruth Sarphatie after gioer. In 1923 they moved to the Sint-Mariaburg area of Ekeren, Antwerp. On 8 September 1942 their home was raided by the Waffen-SS, and Everina Borst and her husband were arrested. She was beaten and tortured by the SS. They brought Gabriel Sarphatie to the 'Dossin Kazerne' at Mechelen where he was sent with convoy X to Auschwitz on 15 September 1942; Everina Borst died of her injuries six months later, on 31 March 1943. She was buried in the cemetery at Brasschaat, and in 1946 was reburied with a monument bearing the inscription "Doodgemarteld voor de democratie" ("Tortured to death for democracy").

On 14 September 1944 the Volksgazet published an article titled "Moeder Sarov" werd langzaam vermoord ("Mother Sarov" was slowly killed).

A street in Sint-Mariaburg has been named Moeder Sarov-straat in her honour.

she was also the foster parent of Rabbi Friedrich see the book 'By the Hand of Hashem': https://www.feldheim.com/by-the-hand-of-hashem
