= Boršt, Novo Mesto =

Boršt
- Location in Slovenia
- Coordinates: 45°50′26″N 15°08′08″E
- Country: Slovenia
- Traditional region: Lower Carniola
- Statistical region: Southwest Slovenia
- Municipality: Novo Mesto
- Elevation: 286 m (938 ft)

Boršt (pronounced [ˈbɔɾʃt], German: Worst) is a former village in southeastern Slovenia in the Municipality of Novo Mesto. It is now part of the village of Daljni Vrh. It is part of the traditional region of Lower Carniola and is now included in the Southeast Slovenia Statistical Region.

== Geography ==
Boršt stands east of the village center of Daljni Vrh on a small stony hill. Strmec Hill (elevation: 384 meters or 1,260 feet) rises to the northeast, and Bršljin Creek (Slovene: Bršljinski potok), a tributary of the Krka River, flows through the valley to the southwest.

== Name ==
Boršt was attested in historical sources as Vorst in 1350 and Varst in 1459. The name Boršt is a relatively frequent name for settlements, regions, and hills in Slovenia. It is derived from the common noun boršt 'woods, forest', borrowed from Middle High German for(e)st 'woods, forest'.

== History ==
Boršt had a population of 14 in three houses in 1870, 16 in three houses in 1880, 20 in three houses in 1900, and 17 in three houses in 1931. Boršt was annexed by the village of Daljni Vrh in 1953, ending its existence as an independent settlement.
