= ERIBA =

Dutch ageing research facility

The European Research Institute for the Biology of Ageing (ERIBA) is a nonprofit research facility based in Groningen, Netherlands, concerned with cross-disciplinary research on ageing. The institute is part of the University Medical Center Groningen and is funded by the Ministry of Economic Affairs, Agriculture and Innovation, the province of Groningen, Collaboration of the Northern Netherlands (SNN), the European Union, the Noaber Foundation and the Pediatric Oncology Foundation Groningen. The total sum granted was €3.95M in 2011 and €7.4M in 2012. The main building was designed by Rudy Uytenhaak Architectenbureau.

== Groups ==
Research groups in ERIBA:

- Ageing Biology and Stem Cells (Gerald de Haan)
- Asymmetric Cell Division and Ageing (Judith Paridaen)
- Cellular Biochemistry (Liesbeth Veenhoff)
- Cellular senescence and age-related pathologies (Marco Demaria)
- Gene Regulation In Ageing and Age-Related Diseases (Cor Calkhoven)
- Genome Structure Ageing (Victor Guryev)
- Genomic Instability in Development and Disease (Floris Foijer)
- Macromolecules and Interactomes (John LaCava)
- Molecular Neurobiology of Ageing (Ellen Nollen)
- Quantitative Epigenetics (Maria Colomé Tatché)
- Stem Cell Regulation and Mechanisms of Regeneration (Eugene Berezikov)
- Telomeres and Genome Integrity (Michael Chang)

== See also ==
- American Aging Association
- Max Planck Institute for Biology of Ageing
