= Jannie Borst =

Dutch cancer immunologist

Jannie G. Keyser-Borst
- Occupation: Cancer immunologist

Academic background
- Education: Leiden University (MS, PhD)
- Doctoral advisor: Dr. Cox P Terhorst

Academic work
- Doctoral students: Peter J. Peters
- Main interests: T cells

Jannie G. Keyser-Borst is a Dutch cancer immunologist. She became professor at Leiden University on 16 January 2019. At the Leiden University Medical Center she ran a research group investigating the regulation of the T cell response.

== Education and career ==
In 1980 she received her Master's degree in biology with chemistry at Leiden University. For the main part of her PhD she worked at the Dana–Farber Cancer Institute, Harvard Medical School in Boston, supervised by Dr. Cox P Terhorst. During this time she unraveled the structure of the CD3/T cell complex. After graduation she worked with immunologists Dr Jan E de Vries and Dr Hergen Spits in the Netherlands. She obtained her Ph.D. degree from Leiden University in 1985. In 1987, she received a 5-year personal fellowship from The Netherlands Organization for Scientific Research.

In 1992, she became staff scientist at the Netherlands Cancer Institute and was named the head of the Division of Immunology in 2002. In 1999, she was appointed professor in Experimental Oncology at the University of Amsterdam.

== Awards ==
She received the Van Loghem career award from the Dutch Society of Immunology in 2009.

In 2012, she was elected EMBO member.

In 2018 she received the Delphine Parrott award for inspiring female scientists by Megan MacLeod during the West of Scotland Immunology Group showcase at the University of Glasgow.

== Important work ==
- The structure of the human T cel receptor/CD3 complex.
- The Gamma delta T cell and the development of the first antibody to detect these cells in humans.
- The identification of TNF receptor CD27 and CD70 ligand as important costimulatory system on T cells.
