= Slotervaartziekenhuis =

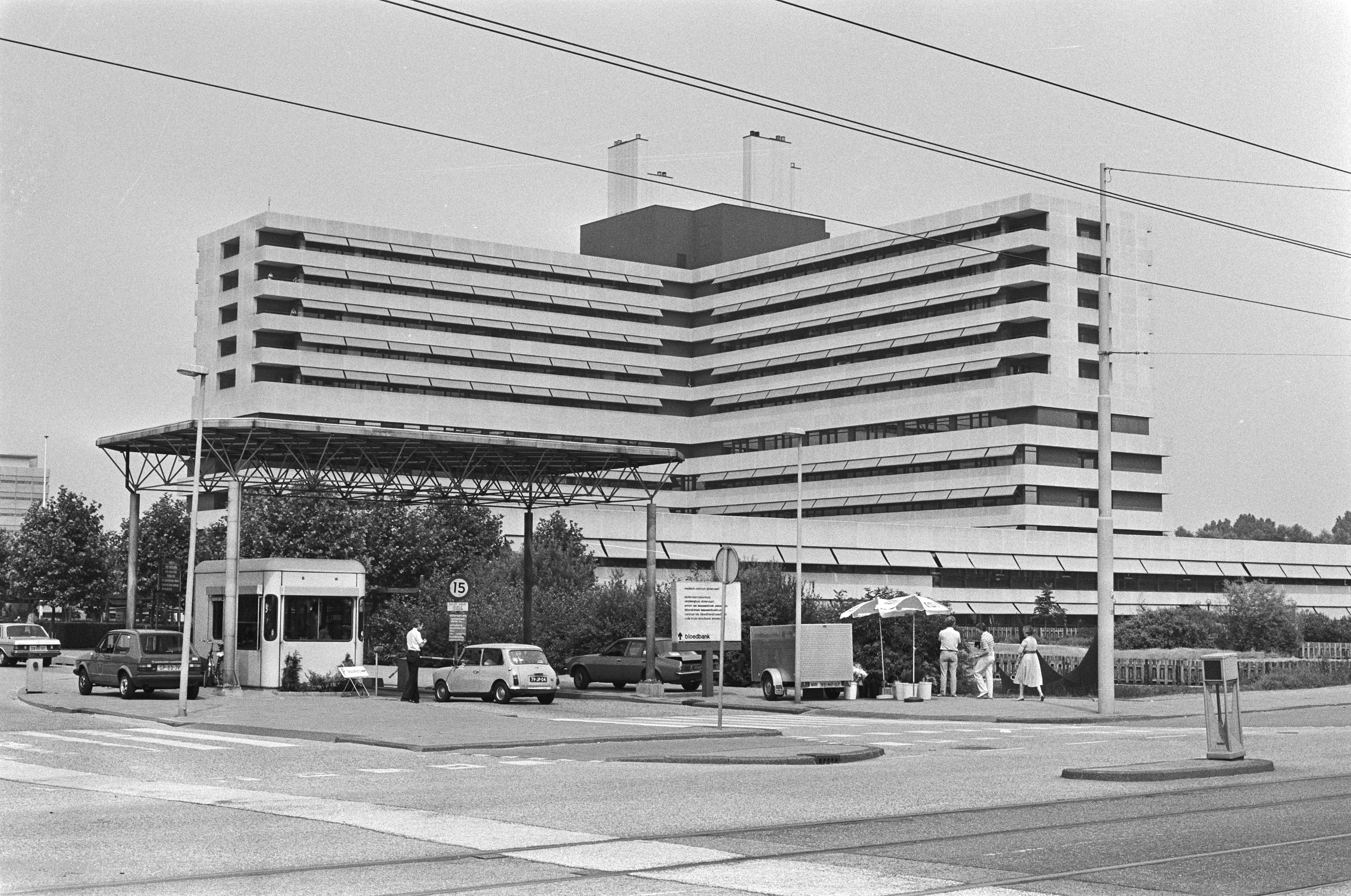
- Slotervaartziekenhuis Hospital in 1982

Geography
- Location: Slotervaart neighbourhood of Amsterdam, the Netherlands
- Coordinates: 52.3482°N 4.8258°E

Organisation
- Type: General

History
- Opened: 1975
- Closed: October 2018

Links
- Lists: Hospitals in the Netherlands

Slotervaartziekenhuis was a hospital in the Slotervaart neighbourhood of Amsterdam, the Netherlands. It went into administration in October 2018, and was closed within days.

== History ==
It was founded in 1975 as a municipal general hospital. It was privatised in July 1997, but was run by a not-for-profit foundation. In 2006 it was sold to Aysel Erbudak, and thereby became the first fully privatised general hospital in the Netherlands. As of 2013 it was owned by Dr Loek Winter.

It produced and supplied heroin to 750 addicts under medical supervision, for which it was paid €3 million a year by the Ministry of Health, Welfare and Sport (Netherlands).
