= Antoni van Leeuwenhoekziekenhuis =

Oncology clinic in Amsterdam

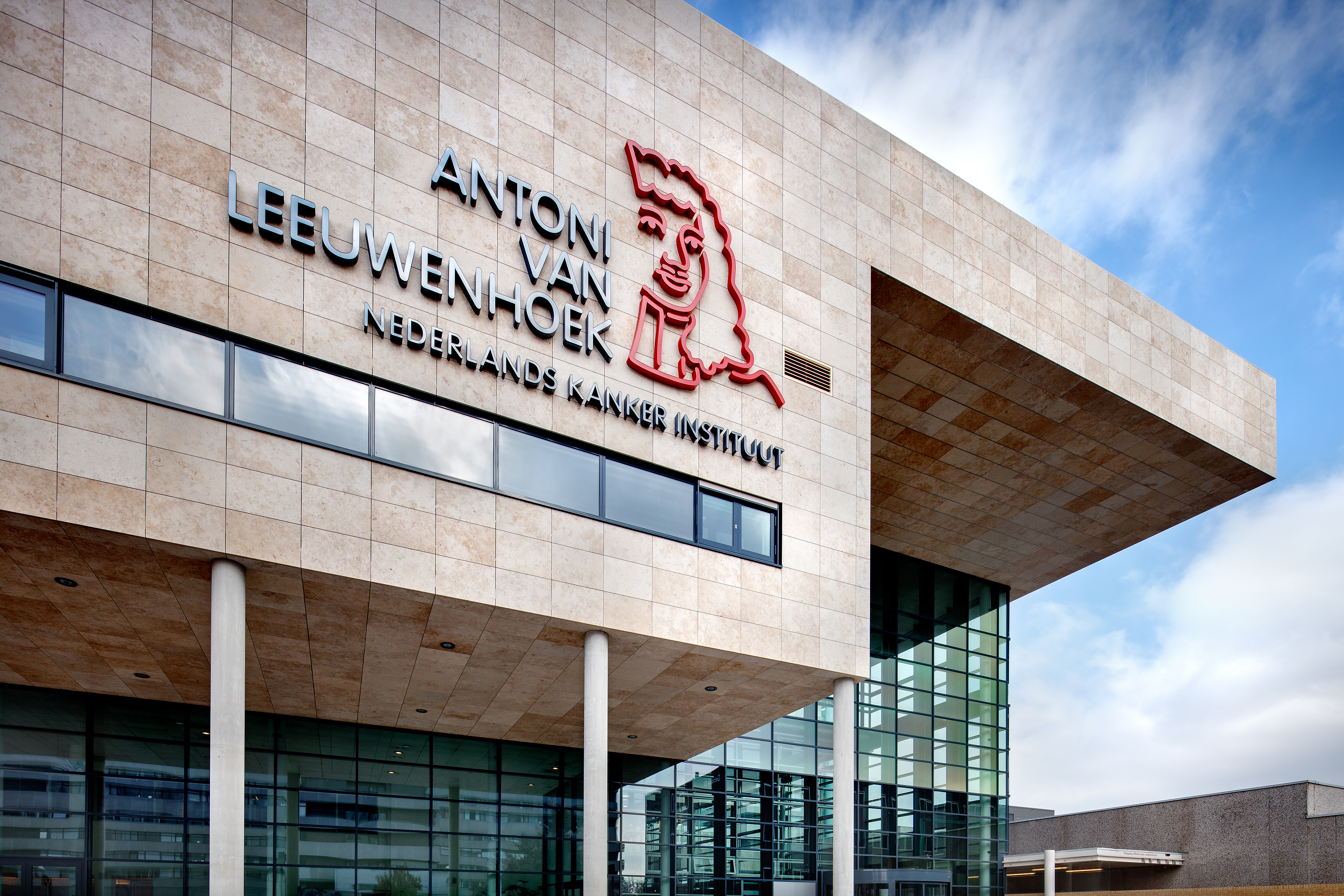
Main entrance in 2018

The Antoni van Leeuwenhoekziekenhuis is a hospital in Amsterdam, the Netherlands, that specialises in oncology: the diagnosis and treatment of cancer. The hospital forms one half of a combined organisation with the Netherlands Cancer Institute (NKI), the NKI-AVL. The NKI-AVL is located in Amsterdam-Slotervaart at the Plesmanlaan next to the Slotervaartziekenhuis and the Amsterdam blood bank (Sanquin).

The hospital is named after Antoni van Leeuwenhoek (1632–1723), who is primarily known in the medical community as one of the first successful developers of microscopes.

== History ==
Surgeon and professor Jacob Rotgans, publisher J.H. de Bussy and pathology professor W.M. de Vries took the initiative in founding the hospital in 1913, right after the formation of the Netherlands Cancer Institute. A national fundraising campaign was held for a new oncological institute. By 26 May 1914, 315,000 Dutch guilders had been raised, that were partially invested in founding a clinic named the "Antoni van Leeuwenhoek-huis" at the Keizersgracht in Amsterdam. Initially, there was room for a maximum of seventeen patients.

In 1929, the organisation relocated to the former Military Hospital at the Sarphatistraat. After all NKI research departments had been established in Slotervaart since 1979, the hospital was moved there as well.
