= Netherlands Cancer Institute =

Dutch research institute

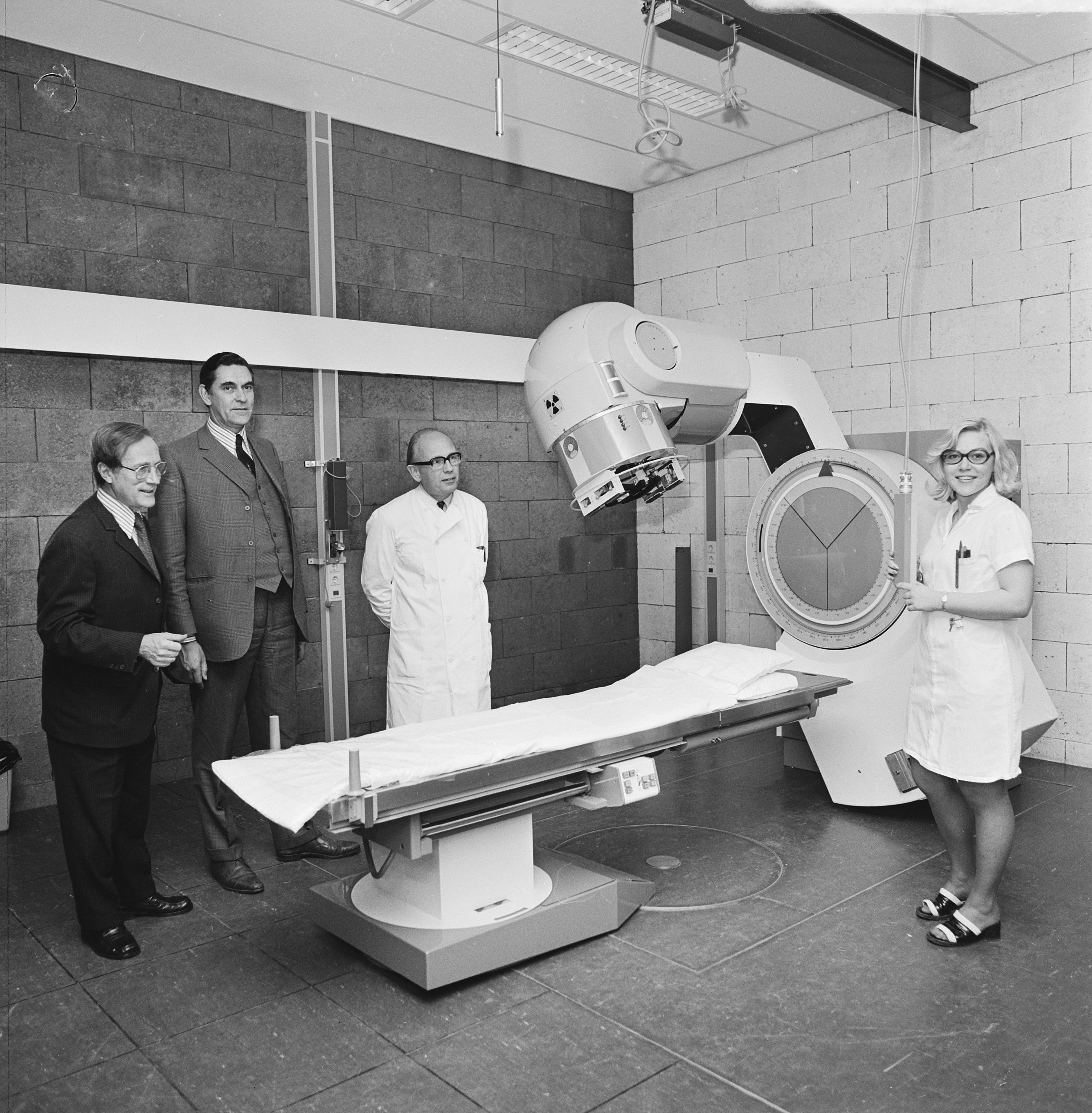
Cobalt radiation (1973)

The Netherlands Cancer Institute (NKI) in Amsterdam was founded in 1913 by, among others, the surgeon Jacob Rotgans. The NKI, together with the Antoni van Leeuwenhoekziekenhuis, is formed into the NKI-AVL, which combines a scientific research institute with a specialized clinic focused on combating the disease cancer. Since 1973 the NKI is located next to the Slotervaartziekenhuis in Amsterdam. NKI is a member of EU-LIFE, an alliance of leading life sciences research centres in Europe.

Core principles of the institute are new methods for diagnostics and treatment. The primary clusters of the NKI-AVL are: Research, Surgical Oncological Disciplines, Medical Oncological Disciplines, Radiotherapy and Diagnostic Oncological Disciplines.

At the start of the 1990s, the NKI, together with the VU University Amsterdam created the Research School for Oncology Amsterdam (OOA) for postdoctoral research and schooling. This research school was accredited by the Royal Netherlands Academy of Arts and Sciences in 1993.

In 2020, scientists at the Institute published observations which have indicated the possibility of a new human organ, a salivary gland, the first such description of a new organ in three hundred years.

== Notable employees ==
- Denise P. Barlow
- René Bernards
- Agathe L. van Beverwijk
- Jannie Borst
- Piet Borst
- Gordon McVie (1980s)
- Laura van't Veer
- Karin E. de Visser
