= Nature Reviews Cancer =

- Discipline: Oncology
- Language: English
- Edited by: Anna Dart

Publication details
- History: Oct. 2001–present
- Publisher: Nature Portfolio
- Frequency: Monthly
- Impact factor: 78.5 (2022)

Standard abbreviations
- ISO 4: Nat. Rev. Cancer

Indexing
- CODEN: NRCAC4
- ISSN: 1474-175X (print); 1474-1768 (web)
- LCCN: 2001243419
- OCLC no.: 48623853

Links
- Journal homepage; Online archive

Nature Reviews Cancer is a monthly review journal covering the field of oncology. It was established in 2001. The editor-in-chief is Anna Dart.

== Abstracting and indexing ==
The journal is abstracted and indexed in:

- PubMed
- Science Citation Index Expanded
- Scopus
- Medline
- SCIMAGOJR

According to the Journal Citation Reports, the journal has a 2021 impact factor of 69.800, ranking it 2nd out of 245 journals in the category "Oncology".
