= List of rectores magnifici of Leiden University =

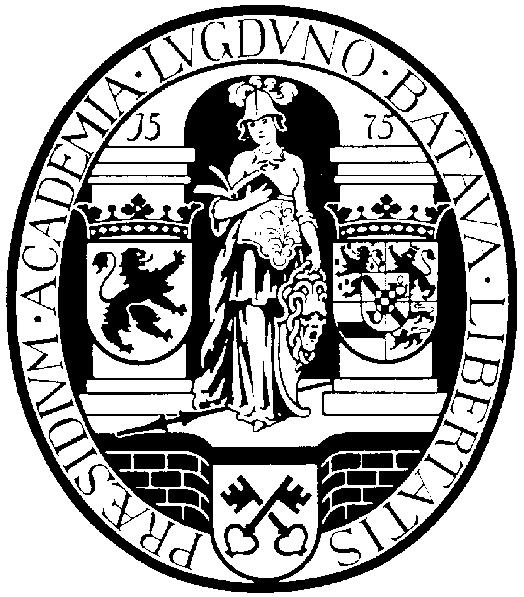
Leiden University seal

This is a list of chancellors (rectores magnifici) of Leiden University, as from 1575. Three Nobel laureates are among these chancellors: Hendrik Lorentz, Heike Kamerlingh Onnes and Willem Einthoven.

== 16th century ==
=== 1575–1600 ===
Period	Name	Image	Additional info
1575–1576	Peter Tiara		
1576–1577	Guilliaume Feuguiéres		
1577–1578	Peter Tiara		
1578–1579	Peter Tiara		
1579–1580	Justus Lipsius		
1580–1581	Justus Lipsius		
1581–1582	Cornelis de Groot		
1582–1583	Gerard Bontius		
1583–1584	Johannes Heurnius		
1584–1585	Johannes Heurnius		
1585–1586	Adrianus Saravia		
1586–1587	Adrianus Saravia		
1587–1588	Justus Lipsius		
1588–1589	Justus Lipsius		
1589–1590	Julius van Beyma		
1590–1591	Julius van Beyma		
1591–1592	Thomas Sosius		Also: Thomas Zoesius or Thomas van Soest
1592–1593	Johannes Heurnius		
1593–1594	Johannes Heurnius		
1594–1595	Cornelis de Groot		
1595–1596	Cornelis de Groot		
1596–1597	Cornelis de Groot		
1597–1598	Franciscus Gomarus		
1598–1599	Franciscus Gomarus		
1599	Gerard Bontius		
1599–1600	Johannes Heurnius		
1600–1601	Johannes Heurnius		

== 17th century ==
=== 1601–1620 ===
Period	Name	Image	Additional info
1601–1602	Pieter Pauw		
1602–1603	Paulus Merula		
1603–1604	Cornelis de Groot		
1604–1605	Everhard van Bronchorst		
1605–1606	Jacobus Arminius		
1606–1607	Pieter Pauw		
1607–1608	Rudolph Snellius		
1608–1609	Cornelis de Groot		
1609–1610	Aelius Everhardus Vorstius		
1610–1611	Rudolph Snellius		
1611–1612	Rudolph Snellius		
1612–1613	Aelius Everhardus Vorstius		
1613–1614	Johannes Polyander		
1614–1615	Pieter Pauw		
1615–1616	Cornelius Paulinus Swanenburg		
1616–1617	Willem van der Codde		
1617–1618	Johannes Polyander		
1618–1619	Johannes Polyander		
1619–1620	Reiner Bontius		
1620–1621	Reiner Bontius		

=== 1621–1640 ===
Period	Name	Image	Additional info
1621–1622	Aelius Everhardus Vorstius		
1622–1623	Aelius Everhardus Vorstius		
1623–1624	Petrus Cunaeus		
1624–1625	Petrus Cunaeus		
1625–1626	Antonius Walaeus		
1626–1627	Antonius Walaeus		
1627–1628	Johannes Polyander		
1628–1629	Johannes Polyander		
1629–1630	Franco Burgersdijk		
1630–1631	Franco Burgersdijk		
1631–1632	Ewaldus Schrevelius		
1632–1633	Petrus Cunaeus		
1633–1634	Antonius Thysius		
1634–1635	Franco Burgersdijk		
1635–1636	Johannes Polyander		
1636–1637	Adolphus Vorstius		
1637–1638	Petrus Cunaeus		
1638–1639	Constantine L'Empereur		
1639	Antonius Walaeus		
1639–1640	Nicolaus Dedel		
1640–1641	Johannes Polyander		

=== 1641–1660 ===
Period	Name	Image	Additional info
1641–1642	Otto Heurnius		
1642–1643	Jacobus Golius		
1643–1644	Jacobus Trigland		
1644–1645	Bernardus Schotanus		
1645–1646	Johannes Polyander		
1646–1647	Ewaldus Schrevelius		
1647–1648	Friedrich Spanheim		
1648–1649	Otto Heurnius		
1649–1650	Arnold Vinnius		
1650–1651	Jacobus Trigland		
1651–1652	Jacobus Golius		
1652–1653	Adolphus Vorstius		
1653–1654	Jacobus Maestertius		
1654–1655	Abraham Heidanus		
1655	Albertus Kyperus		
1655–1656	Joannes Antonides Van Der Linden		
1656–1657	Jacobus Golius		
1657	Arnold Vinnius		
1657–1658	Adriaan Beeckerts van Thienen		
1658–1659	Anthony Thysius the Younger		
1659–1660	Johannes Cocceius		
1660–1661	Adolphus Vorstius		

=== 1661–1680 ===
Period	Name	Image	Additional info
1661–1662	Johann Friedrich Gronovius		
1662–1663	Abraham Heidanus		
1663–1664	Adriaan Beeckerts van Thienen		
1664–1665	Johannes Hoornbeek		
1665–1666	Jacobus Golius		
1666–1667	Florentius Schuyl		
1667–1668	Albertus Rusius		
1668–1669	Johannes Cocceius		
1669–1670	Franciscus Sylvius		
1670–1671	Johann Friedrich Gronovius		
1671–1672	Abraham Heidanus		
1672–1673	Albertus Rusius		
1673–1674	Friedrich Spanheim the Younger		
1674–1675	Arnoldus Seijen		
1675–1676	Johann Friedrich Böckelmann		
1676–1677	Johannes Coccius		
1677–1678	Stephanus le Moyne		
1678–1679	Anton Matthäus III.		
1679–1680	Charles Drelincourt		
1680–1681	Friedrich Spanheim the Younger		

=== 1681–1700 ===
Period	Name	Image	Additional info
1681–1682	Johannes Voet		
1682–1683	Theodorus Rijcke		
1683–1684	Antonius Hulsius		
1684–1685	Lucas Schacht		
1685–1686	Wolferdus Senguerdius		
1686–1687	Johannes Voet		
1687–1688	Friedrich Spanheim the Younger		
1688–1689	Charles Drelincourt		
1689–1690	Jacobus Trigland jr.		
1690–1691	Paul Hermann		
1691–1692	Wolferdus Senguerdius		
1692–1693	Friedrich Spanheim the Younger		
1693–1694	Philippus Reinhardus Vitriarius		
1694–1695	Charles Drelincourt		
1695–1696	Johannes a Marck		
1696–1697	Govert Bidloo		
1697–1698	Burchard de Volder		
1698–1699	Gerhard Noodt		
1699–1700	Jacobus Trigland jr.		
1700–1701	Frederick Dekkers		

== 18th century ==
=== 1701–1720 ===
Period	Name	Image	Additional info
1701–1702	Wolferdus Senguerdius		
1702–1703	Philippus Reinhardus Vitriarius		
1703–1704	Jacobus Gronovius		
1704–1705	Salomon van Til		
1705–1706	Gerhard Noodt		
1706–1707	Jacobus le Mort		
1707–1708	Perizonius		
1708–1709	Franciscus Fabricius		
1709–1710	Johannes Voet		
1710–1711	Bernhardus Albinus		
1711–1712	Jacobus Gronovius		
1712–1713	Johannes a Marck		
1713–1714	Philippus Reinhardus Vitriarius		
1714–1715	Herman Boerhaave		
1715–1716	Wolferdus Senguerdius		
1716–1717	Franciscus Fabricius		
1717–1718	Antonius Schultingh		
1718–1719	Johannes Jacobus Rau		
1719–1720	Pieter Burman the Elder		
1720–1721	Tako Hajo van den Honert		

=== 1721–1740 ===
Period	Name	Image	Additional info
1721–1722	Johann Jacob Vitriarius		
1722–1723	Hermannus Oosterdijk Schacht		
1723–1724	Willem Jacob 's Gravesande		
1724–1725	Franciscus Fabricius		
1725–1726	Johann Ortwin Westenberg		
1726–1727	Bernhard Siegfried Albinus		
1727–1728	Jacobus Wittichius		
1728–1729	Johannes Wesselius		
1729–1730	Antonius Schultingh		
1730–1731	Herman Boerhaave		
1731–1732	Pieter Burman the Elder		
1732–1733	Tako Hajo van den Honert		
1733–1734	Johann Ortwin Westenberg		
1734–1735	Hermannus Oosterdijk Schacht		
1735–1736	Jacobus Wittichius		
1736–1737	Franciscus Fabricius		
1737–1738	Johann Jacob Vitriarius		
1738–1739	Bernhard Siegfried Albinus		
1739–1740	Albertus Schultens		
1740–1741	Johannes Wesselius		

=== 1741–1760 ===
Period	Name	Image	Additional info
1741–1742	Joannes Conradus Rücker		
1742–1743	Adriaan van Royen		
1743–1744	Pieter van Musschenbroeck		
1744–1745	Johan van den Honert		
1745–1746	Gerlach Scheltinga		
1746–1747	Hieronymus David Gaubius		
1747–1748	Tiberius Hemsterhuis		
1748–1749	Johannes Alberti		
1749–1750	Joachim Schwartz		
1750–1751	Frederik Winter		
1751–1752	Franciscus van Oudendorp		
1752–1753	Joannes Esgers		
1753–1754	Andreas Weiss		
1754–1755	Frederik Bernard Albinus		
1755–1756	Johannes Lulofs		
1756–1757	Bernhardinus de Moor		
1757–1758	Joannes Conradus Rücker	|	
1758–1759	Adriaan van Royen		
1759–1760	Jean-Nicolas-Sébastien Allamand		
1760–1761	Jan Jacob Schultens		

=== 1761–1780 ===
Period	Name	Image	Additional info
1761–1762	Gerlach Scheltinga		
1762–1763	Hieronymus David Gaubius		
1763–1764	David van Royen		
1764–1765	Ewaldus Hollebeek		
1765–1766	Frederik Willem Pestel		
1766–1767	Frederik Bernard Albinus		
1767–1768	David Ruhnken		
1768–1769	Aegidius Gillissen		
1769–1770	Bavius Voorda		
1770–1771	Adriaan van Royen		
1771–1772	Lodewijk Caspar Valckenaer		
1772–1773	Hermannus Scholten		
1773–1774	Dionysius Godefridus van der Keessel		
1774–1775	Hieronymus David Gaubius		
1775–1776	Didericus van der Kemp		
1776–1777	Nicolaas Hoogvliet		
1777–1778	Frederik Willem Pestel		
1778	Frederik Bernard Albinus		
1778–1779	Gualtherus van Doeveren		
1779–1780	Dionysius van de Wijnpersse		
1780–1781	Ewaldus Hollebeek		

=== 1781–1800 ===
Period	Name	Image	Additional info
1781–1782	Bavius Voorda		
1782–1783	Eduard Sandifort		
1783–1784	Adriaan Kluit		
1784–1785	Carolus Boers		
1785–1786	Dionysius Godefridus van der Keessel		
1786–1787	Nicolaus Georgius Oosterdijk Johanszoon		
1787–1788	Henry Albert Schultens		
1788–1789	Frederik Willem Pestel		
1789–1790	Jona Willem te Water		
1790–1791	Florentius Jacobus Voltelen		
1791–1792	Dionysius Godefridus van der Keessel		
1792–1793	Broërius Broes		
1793–1794	Nicolaas Paradijs		
1794–1795	Jean Luzac		
1795–1796	Nicolaas Smallenburg		
1796–1797	Sebald Justinus Brugmans		
1797–1798	Sebald Fulco Johannes Rau		
1798–1799	Johannes van der Palm		
1799–1800	Meinardus Simon du Pui		
1800–1801	Jona Willem te Water		

== 19th century ==
=== 1801–1820 ===
Period	Name	Image	Additional info
1801–1802	Eduard Hageman		
1802–1803	Eduard Sandifort		
1803–1804	Joannes van Voorst		
1804–1805	Sebald Fulco Johannes Rau		
1805–1806	Nicolaas Smallenburg		
1806–1807	Nicolaus Georgius Oosterdijk Johanszoon		
1807–1808	Simon Speijert van der Eijk		
1808–1809	Joannes van Voorst	|	
1809–1810	Matthijs Siegenbeek		
1810–1811	Eduard Hageman		
1811–1812	Sebald Justinus Brugmans		
1812	Sebald Justinus Brugmans		
1813–1816	Joan Melchior Kemper		
1816–1817	Joannes van Voorst		
1817–1818	Simon Speijert van der Eijk		
1818–1819	Johannes van der Palm		
1819–1820	Meinardus Simon du Pui		
1820–1821	Nicolaas Smallenburg		

=== 1821–1840 ===
Period	Name	Image	Additional info
1821–1822	Johann Clarisse		
1822–1823	Cornelis Ekama		
1823–1824	Matthijs Siegenbeek		
1824–1825	Gerard Sandifort		
1825–1826	Hendrik Willem Tydeman		
1826–1827	Lucas Suringar		
1827–1828	Gerard Wttewael van Wickenburgh		
1828–1829	Jan Bake		
1829–1830	Michael Jacobus Macquelijn		
1830–1831	Cornelis Jacobus van Assen		
1831–1832	Wessel Albertus van Hengel		
1832–1833	Caspar Georg Carl Reinwardt		
1833–1834	Jacob Nieuwenhuis		
1834–1835	Jacobus Cornelis Broers		
1835–1836	Henricus Cock		
1836–1837	Nicolaas Christiaan Kist		
1837–1838	Pieter Johannes Uijlenbroek		
1838–1839	Petrus Hofman Peerlkamp		
1839–1840	Cornelis Pruijs van der Hoeven		
1840–1841	Johan Rudolph Thorbecke		

=== 1841–1860 ===
Period	Name	Image	Additional info
1841–1842	Johan Frederik van Oordt		
1842–1843	Jan van der Hoeven		
1843–1844	Johannes Matthias Schrant sr.		
1844–1845	Gerard Sandifort		
1845–1846	Hendrik Willem Tydeman		
1846–1847	Jan Hendrik Scholten		
1847–1848	Antonius Henricus van der Boon Mesch		
1848–1849	Antonie Rutgers		
1849–1850	Gerardus Conradus Bernardus Suringar		
1850–1851	Johan de Wal		
1851–1852	Nicolaas Christiaan Kist		
1852–1853	Gideon Jan Verdam		
1853–1854	Theodoor Willem Johannes Juynboll		
1854–1855	Frederik Willem Krieger		
1855–1856	Simon Vissering		
1856–1857	Jan Hendrik Scholten		
1857–1858	Frederik Kaiser		
1858–1859	Jan Hendrik Stuffken		
1859–1860	Abraham Everard Simon Thomas		
1860–1861	Johan de Wal		

=== 1861–1880 ===
Period	Name	Image	Additional info
1861–1862	Abraham Kuenen		
1862–1863	Pieter Rijke		
1863–1864	Carel Gabriel Cobet		
1864–1865	Hidde Justusz Halbertsma		
1865–1866	Rembt van Boneval Faure		
1866–1867	Johannes Jacobus Prins		
1867–1868	Willem Frederik Reinier Suringar		
1868–1869	Reinhart Dozy		
1869–1870	Johan Christiaan Gottlob Evers		
1870–1871	Joël Emanuel Goudsmit		
1871–1872	Lodewijk Willem Ernst Rauwenhoff		
1872–1873	David Bierens de Haan		
1873–1874	Matthias de Vries		
1874–1875	Adriaan Heynsius		
1875–1876	Joannes Theodorus Buys		
1876–1877	Jan Hendrik Scholten		
1877	Pieter van Geer		
1877–1878	Robert Fruin		
1878–1879	Anthony Modderman		
1879–1880	Johan Hendrik Caspar Kern		
1880–1881	Teunis Zaayer		

=== 1881–1900 ===
Period	Name	Image	Additional info
1881–1882	Michael Jan de Goeje		
1882–1883	Pieter van Geer		
1883–1884	Derk Doyer		
1884–1885	Guillaume Daniel Louis Huet		
1885–1886	Jan Pieter Nicolaas Land		
1886–1887	H. G. van de Sande Bakhuyzen		
1887–1888	Samuel Siegmund Rosenstein		
1888–1889	Jacob Maarten van Bemmelen		
1889–1890	Antoine Paul Nicolas Franchimont		
1890–1891	Christiaan Karel Hoffmann		
1891–1892	Henricus Oort		
1892–1893	Cornelis Petrus Tiele		
1893–1894	Sybrandus Johannes Fockema Andreae		
1894–1895	Pieter Antonie van der Lith		
1895–1896	Karl Martin		
1896–1897	Albert Cornelis Vreede		
1897–1898	Theodorus Hendrik Mac Gillavry		
1898–1899	P. J. Cosijn		
1899–1900	Hendrik Antoon Lorentz		
1900–1901	Jan Egens van Iterson (J.Azn.)		

== 20th century ==
=== 1901–1920 ===
Period	Name	Image	Additional info
1901–1902	Henri van der Hoeven		
1902	Willem van der Vlugt		
1903	Hendrik Barend Greven		
1903–1904	Heike Kamerlingh Onnes		
1904–1905	Jan van Leeuwen		
1905–1906	Willem Einthoven		
1906–1907	Willem Nolen		
1907–1908	Jacobus Johannes Hartman		
1908–1909	Jacob Verdam		
1909–1910	Jan Cornelis Kluijver		
1910–1911	Petrus Johannes Blok		
1911–1912	Fredrik Pijper		
1912–1913	Bernardus Dirks Eerdmans		
1913–1914	Gerbrandus Jelgersma		
1914–1915	Jacobus Marinus Janse		
1915–1916	William Brede Kristensen		
1916–1917	Cornelis van Vollenhoven		
1917–1918	Gerrit Kalff		
1918–1919	Pieter Cornelis Tobias van der Hoeven		
1919–1920	Anton Willem Nieuwenhuis		
1920–1921	Reinder Pieters van Calcar		

=== 1921–1940 ===
Period	Name	Image	Additional info
1921–1922	Christiaan Snouck Hurgronje		
1922	Johannes Petrus Kuenen		
1922–1923	Leopold van Itallie		
1923–1924	Hugo Krabbe		
1924–1925	Anthony Johannes Blok		
1925–1926	Willem de Sitter		
1926–1927	Eduard Meijers		
1927–1928	Arent Jan Wensinck		
1928–1929	Willem Jan Mari van Eysinga		
1929–1930	Nicolaas van Wijk		
1930–1931	J. Ph. Vogel		
1931–1932	Jan Johannes Blanksma		
1932	Johannes Henricus Zaaijer		
1932–1933	Johan Huizinga		
1933–1934	Durk van Blom		
1934–1935	Willem van der Woude		
1935–1936	Anne Siberdinus de Blécourt		
1936–1937	Jan van der Hoeve		
1937–1938	Ton Barge		
1938–1939	Paul Christiaan Flu		
1939–1940	Frederik Muller Jzn		
1940–1941	Alexander Willem Byvanck		

=== 1941–1960 ===
Period	Name	Image	Additional info
1941-1943	Willem van der Woude		(acting rector); Leiden University mostly closed after 27 November 1941)
1943-1945	--		(Leiden University was closed because of the German Occupation)
1945	Willem van der Woude		(May–September)
1945–1946	Berend George Escher		
1946–1947	Rudolph Cleveringa		
1947–1948	Julius Christiaan van Oven		
1948–1949	Cornelis Christiaan Berg		
1949–1950	Bernard van Groningen		
1950–1951	Siegfried Thomas Bok		
1951–1952	Julius Herman Boeke		
1952–1953	J. J. L. Duyvendak		
1953–1954	Jacob Maarten van Bemmelen Jr		
1954–1955	Jan Nicolaas Bakhuizen van den Brink		
1955–1956	Anton Eduard van Arkel		
1956–1957	Pieter Arie Hendrik de Boer		
1957–1958	Samuel Elzevier de Jongh		
1958–1959	Herman Johannes Lam		
1959–1960	Jan Engbertus Jonkers		
1960–1961	Jan Volkert Rijpperda Wierdsma		

=== 1961–2000 ===
Period	Name	Image	Additional info
1961–1962	Gerhard Sevenster		
1962–1963	Sem Dresden		
1963–1964	Wim den Boer		
1964–1965	Donald Johan Kuenen		
1965–1966	Johan Dankmeijer		
1966–1967	Klaas Aldert Hendrik Hidding		
1967–1968	Piet Muntendam		
1968–1969	Louis Kukenheim Ezn.		
1969–1970	Johan Goslings		
1970–1971	Cornelis Soeteman		
1971–1972	Willem Roelof Oege Goslings		
1972–1976	Dolf Cohen		
1976–1979	Donald Johan Kuenen		
1979–1985	Ton Kassenaar		
1985–1991	Jan Beenakker		
1991–1997	Lammert Leertouwer		
1997–2001	Willem Albert Wagenaar		

== 21st century ==
Period	Name	Image	Additional info
2001–2007	Douwe Breimer		Also chairman of the college van bestuur
2007–2013	Paul F. van der Heijden		Also chairman of the college van bestuur
2013–2021	Carel Stolker		Also chairman of the college van bestuur
2021–2025	Hester Bijl		
2026–	Sarah de Rijcke		

== See also ==
- List of Leiden University people

== Literature ==
- Harm Beukers [et al.].: Album Scholasticum academiae Lugduno-Batavae MCMLXXV-MCMLXXXIX. (1575–1989), Leids Universiteits-Fonds, Leiden, 1991
- R.E.O. Ekkart: Athenae Batavae. De Leidse Universiteit / The University of Leiden 1575-1975. Universitaire Pers Leiden, 1975. ISBN 90-6021-222-3
- Icones Leidenses. Leiden, Universitaire Pers, 1973. ISBN 9060211839
