= Joannes Antonides van der Linden =

Johannes Antonides van der Linden
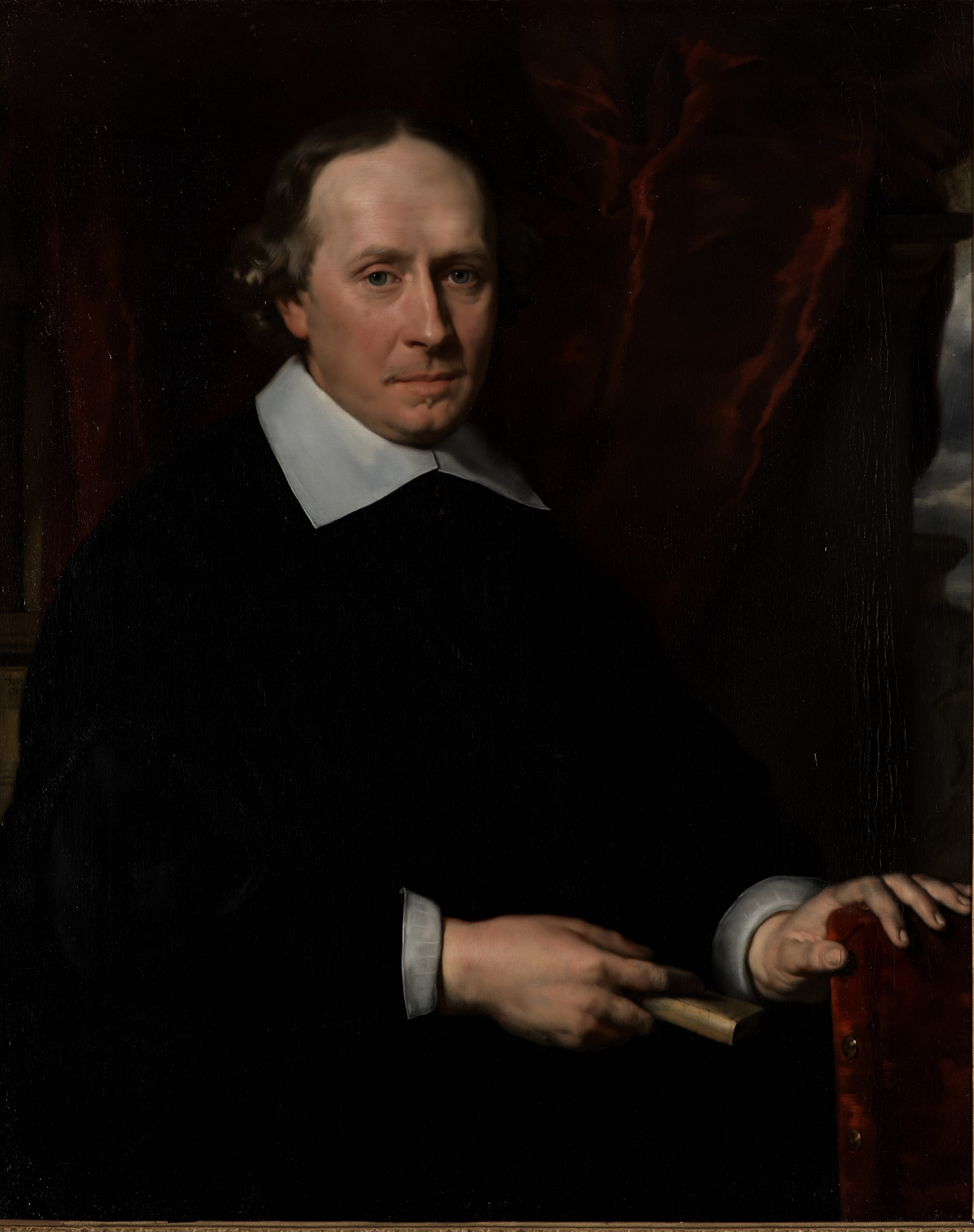
- Johannes Antonides Van Der Linden by Abraham Lambertsz van den Tempel
- Born: 13 January 1609; Enkhuizen
- Died: 5 March 1664; Leiden
- Education: University of Franeker
- Known for: the medical bibliography De Medicis scriptis libri duo
- Scientific career
- Fields: Physician, writer
- Workplaces: University of Leiden

Johannes Antonides van der Linden (or Jan Antonides van der Linden) (1609–1664) was a Dutch physician, botanist, author and librarian. He was born on 13 January 1609 in Enkhuizen.

== Life ==
Johannes Antonides van der Linden was the son of the physician Antonius Hendrikszoon van der Linden (1570/1-1633), and grandson of Heinrich Anton Nerdenus (1546–1614; a professor at the University of Franeker). He initially attended the Latin School in his hometown, where his father taught. At 10 years of age he moved to live with his uncle Hermann Antonides in Naarden, but returned to Enkhuizen two years later to a school run by Willem van Nieuwenhuizen. In 1625 he enrolled at the University of Leiden and completed initial studies in natural history and philosophy under Gilbert Jachaeus (1578–1628) and Franco Petri Burgersdijk .

He then turned to medical studies, attending lectures by Otto Heurnius, Ewaldus Schrevelius, Adrian van Falkenburg (1581–1650) and Adolphus Vorstius. He continued his studies under Menelaus Winsemius (1591–1639), and completed his doctorate on 19 October 1630 with a treatise on De virulentia venerea. In 1631 he went to Amsterdam, where he worked in medicine with his father. Here he was able to continue his studies using his father's extensive library, and became a good friend of Nicolaes Tulp.

He married Helena Grondt in 1634 in Amsterdam; they subsequently had five daughters and two sons.

He stood high in esteem in Amsterdam and in 1637, was inspector of the medical college there. Following an invitation (August 1639) from their Professor of Anatomy and Botany, van der Linden joined the University of Franeker, giving his introductory lecture on De medico futuro necessariis (On 26 November 1639) then enrolled in the registers on 2 December 1639. An important fruit of his studies was the medical bibliography De Medici libri duo scriptis (Garrison-Morton 6744), which was enlarged through 3 editions while he lived, and then by later authors.

During his twelve-year tenure in Franeker he led dissections, and was appointed Director of the college (1643/1644). In 1649 he rejected a professorship at the University of Utrecht, but subsequently accepted a new appointment at the University of Leiden as professor of practical medicine (1651). As head of the Leiden University Hospital, he also worked with Franciscus Sylvius. Linden, a great admirer of Hippocrates and Aristotle, seems in later years to have developed an interest in the philosophy of René Descartes.

He died on 5 March 1664 in Leiden.

== Selected works ==
- De Medicis scriptis libri duo. Amsterdam 1637, 1651, 1662
- Medulla Med., Partibus Quatuor comprehensa, Franeker 1642, Amsterdam 1645, Franeker 1648
