= Antonius Hulsius =

German Philologist and Calvinist theologian

Antonius Hulsius Anton Hüls
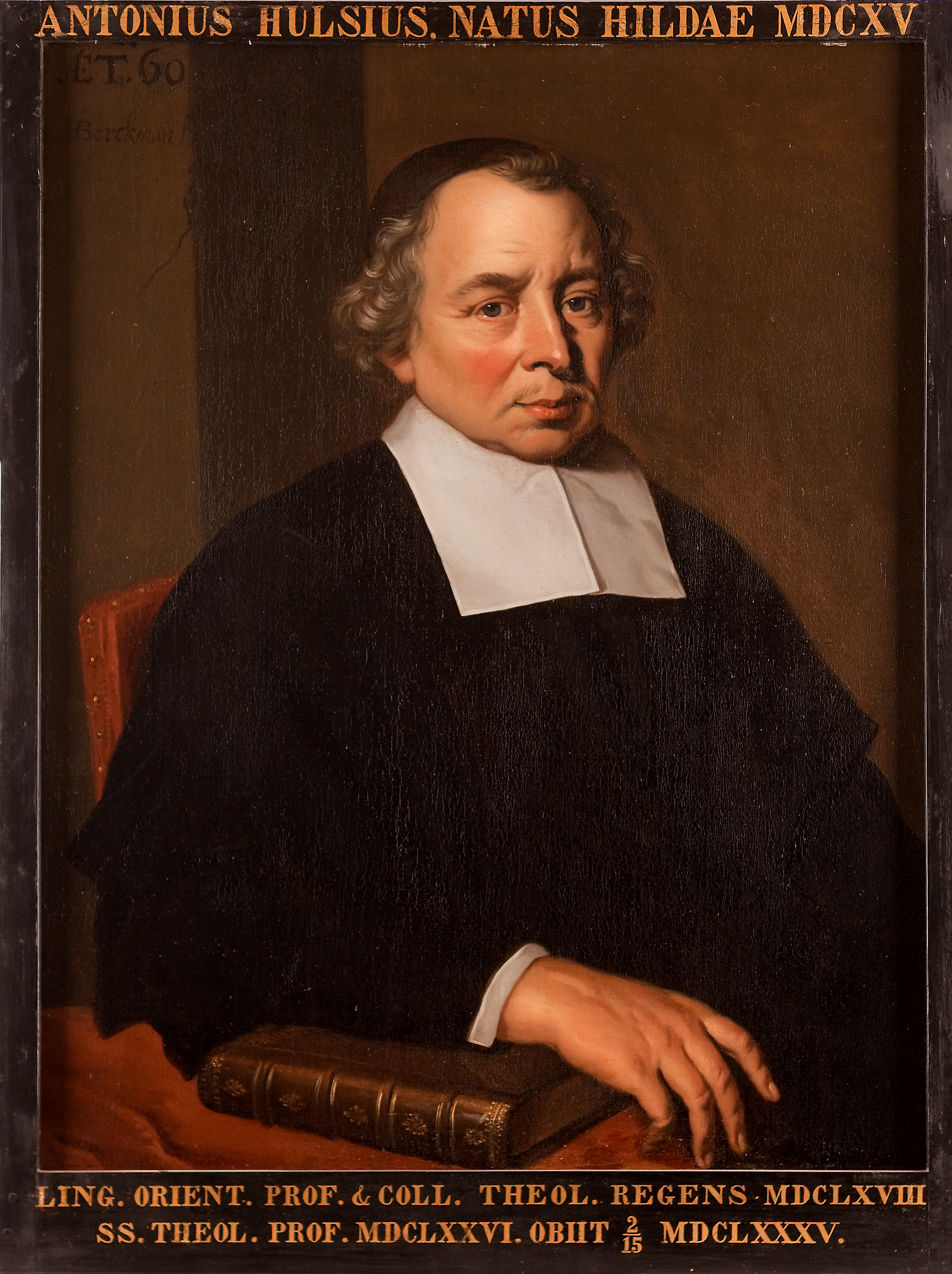
- Born: 1615; Haus Hagdorn, Hilden, Berg (Palatinate-Neuburg), Germany
- Died: 27 February 1685 (aged 69–70) ( Gregorian); Leiden, United Provinces of the Netherlands
- Occupations: Philologist; Calvinist theologian Hebraist
- Spouse: Agnes Elisabeth Rumpf
- Children: 10 of whom 4 – all of them sons – survived to adulthood.

Antonius Hulsius (Anton Hüls: 1615 – 27 February 1685) was a German philologist and Calvinist theologian.

== Life ==
Hulsius was born towards the end of 1615 at Hilden, a midsized manufacturing town in the hill-country east of Düsseldorf, at a time when Lutheran Protestantism had recently been supplanted by Calvinist Protestantism as the mainstream religion of the townsfolk, while the local lord was still adhering to the Catholicism of his forefathers. It was a period of intense religious conflict in the Rhineland, and the life of Antonius Hulsius would be deeply impacted by the Thirty Years' War (1618–1648). His father, also called Antonius Hulsius, was the local mayor. His mother, born Catharina von Venne, died in 1628 when the boy was just 13, after which he went to live with his elder brother, the young theologian-paster Wilhelmus Hülsius (Wilhelm Hüls: 1598–1659) at Wesel, some distance to the north. He attended the "Gymnasium" (secondary school) in Wesel where he received a solid academic grounding.

He moved on in 1635 to the gymnasium illustre at Deventer, then under the direction of Nikolaus Vedelius (1596–1642). His studies at Deventer focused on Hebrew and Theology. By 1636 the war had been underway for eighteen years, and the movements of large armies correlated with an increased frequency and intensity of plague. Deventer was badly affected in that year. Hulsius fled, travelling over the next couple of years to Paris, London and Cambridge. Everywhere he went, he found opportunities for further study. According to at least one source he also spent time in Oxford where he mastered English. In or before 1638 Hulsius travelled to Geneva, where Calvinism was still particularly firmly entrenched. He studied at the "académie de Genève" (as the university was known at that time), while lodging with Friedrich Spanheim (1600–1649), who had been the rector at the académie between 1633 and 1637, and already enjoyed a powerful reputation as an uncompromising advocate of "orthodox calvinism". Hulsius remained in Geneva for approximately two years, during which, there are references to his having delivered his first sermons at the local German language church.

Hulsius returned to the Netherlands during or shortly before 1640, and spent several years working at Leiden, Amsterdam and Groningen, having become in 1640 a backer of the so-called "Walloon church", which was a Protestant-Calvinist community, comprising mainly Huguenots and other Protestants who had moved from France and Catholic southern Flanders to the Netherlands, attracted by the Dutch reputation for religious tolerance. After a period based in Amsterdam he became minister to the francophone community in Breda, participating with particular devotion in the construction of their church building. In 1644 the still recently formed congregation to elected Hulsius minister. He would exercise his ministry at Breda for the next 25 years.

He also took a teaching position at the newly opened Breda "gymnasium illustre" (as it was identified at the time) academy, and began teaching Hebrew there, probably in 1646. He was evidently well established as a staff member at the institution in 1648, when he witnessed the will of the academy's "curator residens", André Rivet.

In 1650, while at Breda, Hulsius had his Hebrew-Latin bible, "Nomenclator biblicus hebraeo-latinus" produced. It was his first significant published work. A succession of further publications relating to Theology quickly followed.

Hulsius was a participant at the church's Synods at Haarlem in April 1660, Middelburg in May 1666 and Naarden in September 1668. In his dealings with representatives of other denominations, he became ever more trenchant in his promotion of the Calvinist orthodoxy associated with what has become known as the Dutch Reformed Church. His robust championing of the "orthodox" wing of his church was on display, in particular, in his sustained attacks on the heterodox mysticist pietism of Jean de Labadie.

On 21 July 1668 Friedrich Spanheim (1632–1701), whom Hulsius must have known as a boy when he lodged in Geneva with Friedrich Spanheim (1600–1649), the child's father, during the 1930s, had Hulsius appointed "Regent of the Flemish College" at Leiden University. Here the duties assigned to Hulsius involved educating and looking after young men destined for the (Calvinist) Christian ministry. He taught Theology and attended to any behavioural issues arising. A parallel appointment followed a few weeks later when he was appointed to an assistant professorship in Hebrew on 23 August. The administrators at the Flemish College took the opportunity to reduce his salary from 1,400 Florins to 1,200 Florins, having regard to his 400 Florin salary as a university assistant professor.

On 16 January 1676 he accepted a full "ordinary" professorship at the university in Theology and Hebrew. He applied himself to his new duties with energy and zeal, and was rewarded with considerable success. Nevertheless, as the intellectual currents in Protestant Theology departments moved on during the second half of the seventeenth century, he also became the target of intensifying criticism and satire from those who did not share his uncompromising religious approach. His final years were marked – and in the eyes of some "less conservative" commentators his reputation was scarred – by high-profile disputes against the covenanter from Franeker, Johannes Cocceius and the Cartesian controversialist, Abraham Heidanus.

More than three centuries later, there is widespread respect and appreciation among scholars for his contributions to the study of Greek and Hebrew. He also was a professor at Leyden University, where he took a share in university and faculty administration. He served as Dean of the Theology Faculty in 1680, and as Rector if the University Senate between 1683 and 1684.

Sources differ as to the precise date of his death, but there is agreement that Antonius Hulsius died during February 1685. His funeral oration was delivered by Friedrich Spanheim.

== Personal ==
Antonius Hulsius married Agnes Elisabeth Rumpf at the Hague in January 1945. The bride was the youngest of the seven children born to the physician Christian Rumpf (1580–1645) by his marriage to Agneta de Spina (1590–1649). The marriage was followed by the births of ten children, of whom at least eight lived long enough to be baptised at Breda. The daughters all died young, but four of the sons survived to adulthood. These all became theologians and/or church ministers.

== Output (selection) ==
- Nomenclator biblicus hebraeo-latinus cum tribus indicibus. Opus novum, quale in hebraicis ante hac non visum, cujus institutum et multiplicem usum docet praefatio. Breda 1650 (books.google.de)
- Scrutinium memoriae Generosiorbus dicatum ingeniis quae linguarum Reginam, non in limine cum theologastrorum vulgo sed in intimis penetralibus salutare gestiunt. Breda 1650 (books.google.de)
- Theologiae judaicae pars prima de Messia. Eaque κατασκευαστική doctrinae judaeorum, ex verbo Dei confutatae. Addito breviaria locorum Scripturae, quae a vanis rabbinorum glossematis repurgata, veritati restituuntur. Breda 1653, (books.google.de)
- Non-ens prae-adamiticum, sive Confutatio vani & socinizantis cujusdam Somnii, quo S. Scripturae praetextu incautioribus nuper imponere conatus est quidam Anonymus fingens. Leiden 1656 (books.google.de)
- Conferentie over d' Augsburgsche Confessie gehouden tot Leipzig. Breda 1657; Leiden 1659
- Systema logicum. Traditionis et methodi perspicuitate post innumera systemata vere novum. In usum collegii logici bredani ex optimis logices scriptoribus congestum, et in 78 lectiones ad finem operis, ita ut trimestris spatio absolvi possit, distributum. Dordrecht 1658
- Authentia absoluta s. textus hebraei vindicata contra criminationes Cl. Viri Isaaci Vossii in libro recens edito translatione LXX interpretum Adduntur epistolae binae. Una ad Cl. Colvium de parallelismis. Altera ad Cl. Vossium de periculo suae sententiae. Rotterdam 1662 (books.google.de)
- Rhematologia major latino-belgica. Seu Rhematologiae editio nova, exemplis locupletata, quibus elegantiarum fontes aperiuntur, atque singulorum verborum constructio atque usus cum proprius tum metaphoricus perspicue demonstratur. Libellus omnibus purae latinitatis amatoribus uülissimus. Accessit etiam index vocum belgicarum qui dictionarii loco esse possit. Dordrecht 1665
- Delineatio brevis quatuor praecipuarum partium institutions hebraicae, in usum collegii grammatici. Leiden 1668
- Disputatio epistolaris hebraica, inter A. H. (...) et Jacobum Abendanah rabbicum Amsteradamensem. Super loco Haggaei cap. 2 v. 9 (...). Addita versione latina. In usum collegii rabbinici. Leiden 1669
- Opus catecheticum didacticopolemicum quo praeter analyticam Catecheseos Palatino-Belgicae expositionem CLXXXPV controversiae theol. ad Catecheticum Ordinem redactae (...) compendiose ventilantur. Leiden 1673–1676, 2 Bde.,
- De draad van Ariadne. Aanwijsende dat de hedendaaghse nieuwigheden strijden tegens de Nederlantsche Belijdenisse des geloofs. De selve voorstellende als een middel om uit des en dool-hof te geraken. Leiden 1676
- Examen Catecheticum Didactico-Polemicum, quo praeter analyticam Catecheseos Palatino-Belgicae expositionem CLXXXII controversiae theologicae, ad catecheticam ordinem redactae, ventilantur. Leiden 1676
- Discussio considerationum in quinque priores positiones. London 1676 (Digitalisat in der Digitalen Bibliothek Mecklenburg-Vorpommern)
- Compendium lex ui hebraici Compendio Biblico Leusdano subjunctum. Continens sub 1900 radicibus hebraeis voces latinas 3268 quibus constat universus Veteris Test. textus. Praeter aliqua quadratae et chaldaicae in fine seorsim addita (...). 1673; 4. Aufl. Utrecht 1679
- Nucleus prophetiae in duas partes distribuais. Prima de vaticiniis, altera de typ is illustrioribus Veteris Testamenti, quibus Christus et vera eius ecclesia demonstrantur, typi et figurae ad suos antitypos analogice referuntur, effata prophetica adversus judaeorum exceptiones, argutias, deliria vindicantur (...). Accessit disputatio hebraica ad Hag. II, 9. Item Mantissa ad Dan. XII, 2 (...). Leiden 1683
- Animadversiones in Historiam Concilii Tridentini adversus card. Pallavicinium. o. O., 1685
