= Charles Drelincourt (physician) =

French physician (1633–1697)

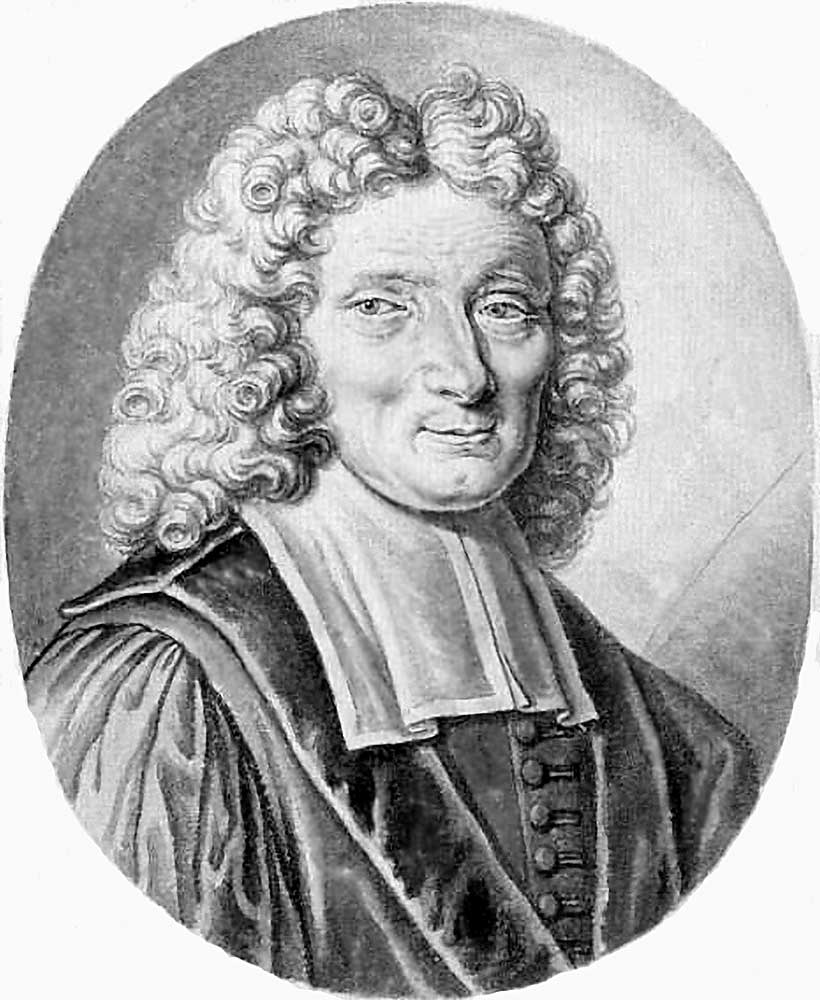

Charles Drelincourt (1 February 1633 – 31 May 1697) was a French physician.

== Biography ==
Born in Paris, he was the son of Charles Drelincourt, Reformed minister in Paris and of Marguerite Boldue, the only daughter of a wealthy Parisian beer brewer. He was raised a Protestant.

After studies in Paris with Jean Riolan, then in Saumur and Montpellier where he received his doctorate in 1654, he practised in Paris where he met Charles Patin and became, in 1655, the particular physician of Turenne.

From 1656 to 1658, he was appointed French army's medical service Inspector in Flanders then he became in 1659 the First physician of the King (fr) Louis XIV.

He married Susanna Jacobs and the couple moved to Leiden in 1668. There he held the Chair of Medicine at Leiden University, where he was the successor of Joannes Antonides Van Der Linden and the predecessor Herman Boerhaave. He was also Rector of the university in 1679, 1688 and 1694.

Drelincourt was a prominent scholar of Hippocrates and classic literature with a great knowledge of classical languages, which granted him much recognition among his contemporaries, especially Pierre Bayle.

In his lectures, Boerhaave praised him and used to call him "nitidus incisor".

He died in Leiden in 1697 aged 64.

== Works ==
- Clarissimum Monspeliensis Apollinis Stadium currente C. Drelincurtio, Caroli filio, Parisio, & Liberalium Artrium Magistro, Doctoratum ambiente anno salutis M. DC. LIV, Quaestio Therapeutica pro prima Apollinari laurea consequenda, proposita ab illustrissimo viro D. D. Lazaro Riverio Regis Consilaiario & Medicorum Academia Professore dignissimo, sub hac verborum serie: Anomibus putridis Febribus section. & Purgatio Montpellier 1654, Leiden 1680
- Questiones quatuor Cardinales, pro suprema Apollinari daphne consequenda, proposita ab illustrissimis viris D. D. Richero de Balleval . . . & D. D. Simeone Curtaudo … Quarum veritatem, seriis exactis, triduum integrum mane & vesperi tueri conabitur Carolus Drelincurtius, . . . Medicinae Licentiatus, in inclyto Monspeliensis Apollinis sano Montpellier
- Oratio Doctoralis Monspessula, qua Medicos, jugi Dei Operum considertatione atque contemplatione permotos, caeteris hominibus Religioni adstrictiores esse demonstrator: atque added impietatis crimen in ipsos jactatum diluitur
- Quaestio Physiologica, an Partus octimestris vitalis? Paris 1664
- La Légende du Gascon, ou Lettre à M. Porée sur la méthode prétendue nouvelle de tailler la Pierre, & deux autres Lettres sur le même sujet Leiden 1665, 1674, 1680
- Quaestio Medica de partu octimestri vivaci Leiden 1668 (Online)
- De partu octimestri vivaci diatriba Paris 1662, Leiden 1666, 1668 (Online)
- Oratio, quam super Civitatis & Academiae calamitatibus generatim & paucis, tum super clarissimi viri Johannis van Horne natalibus, vitae institutio, & e vivis excessu, singulatim & plenius, brevibus tamen, anno habuit ineunte 1670 Leiden 1670, 1680 (Online)
- Anatomicum Preludium Leiden 1670, 1672
- Regii olim in Galliis Medici, nuc vero in Universitate Lugdunensis Professoris Practici & Anatomici, Apologia Medicos sexcentis annis Roma exulasse Leiden 1671 (Aufsatz)
- Apologia medica, Qua depellitur illa calumnia Medicos sexcentis annis Roma exulasse. Leiden 1671 (Online) 1672 (Online)
- Libitina trophea, cum appendice ad glandulosos Doctores. Leiden 1680 (Online)
- De foeminarum ovis, Tam intra testiculos & uterum quam extra, ab Anno 1666 ad retro secula Leiden 1684
- Super humani foetus umbilico Meditationes Elenctice Leiden 1685 (Online)
- De Humani Foetus Membranis Hypomnemata Leiden 1685 (online)
- De foetuum pileolo, sive galea emmendationes (On the little Cap or Helmet of Fetus). Leiden 1685 (Online)
- De Conceptione adversaria Leiden 1685 (Online)
- De tunica foetus allantoide Meletemata Leiden 1685 (Online)
- De conceptu conceptus quibus mirabilia Dei super foetus humani formatione, nutritione atque partione, sacro velo hactenus tecta, systemate felici reteguntur Leiden 1685 (Online)
- De foeminarum ovis historiae, atque physicae lucubrationes 1687 (Online)
- Experimenta Anatomica ex vivorum sectionibus petita per Ernestum Gottfried Heyse Leiden 1681, 1682, 1684
- Homericus Achilles Caroli Drelincurtii Penicillo Delineatus, Per Convicia Et Laudes Leiden 1693, 1694, 1696
- Opuscula medica, quae reperiri potuere omnia The Hague 1717
