= Paulus Merula =

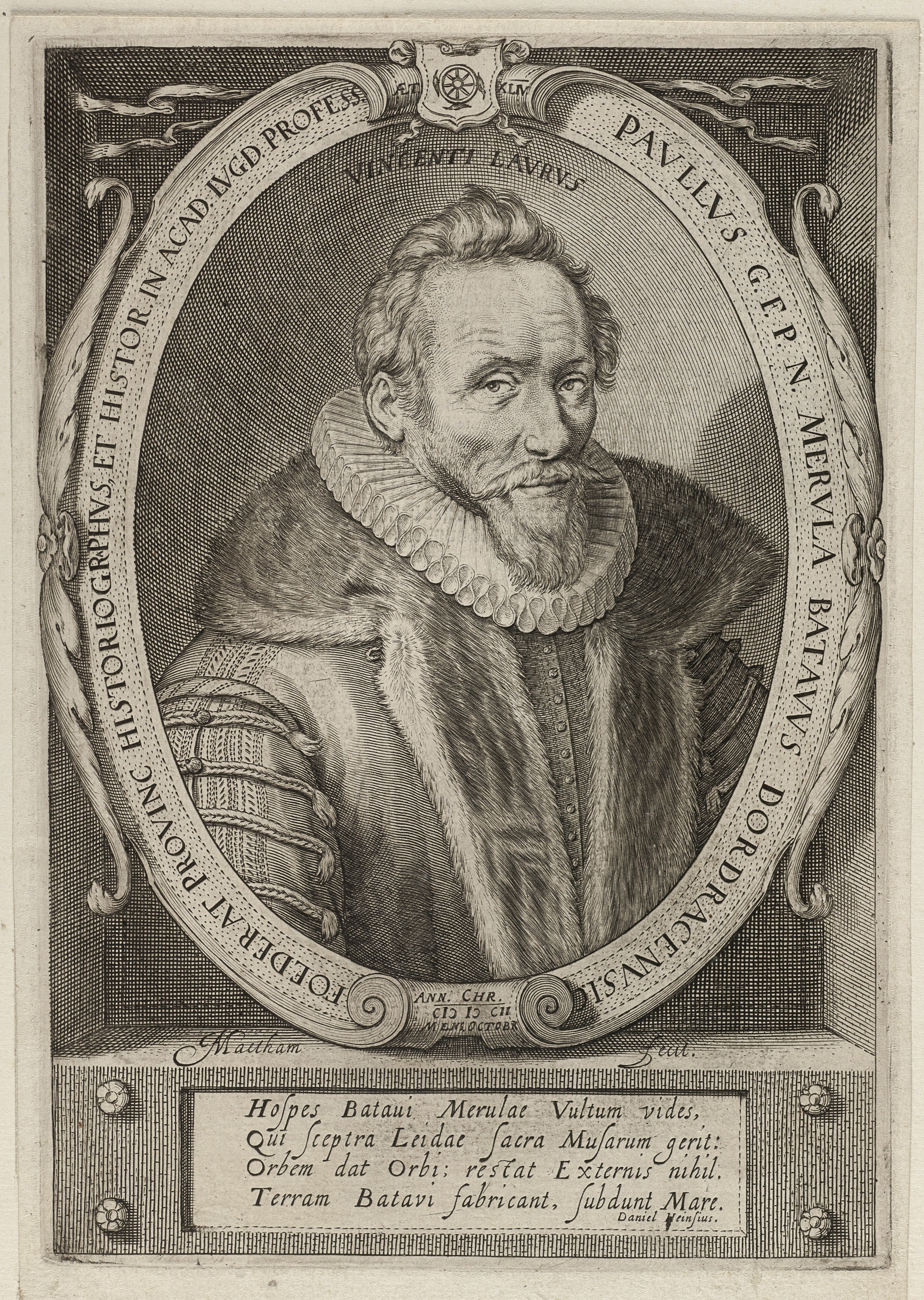
Line drawing of Paulus Merula, ca. 1605, by Vincent Laurus

Paulus Merula, or Paul van Merle (Dordrecht, 19 August 1558 - Rostock, 20 July 1607) was a Dutch jurist, classicist, historian, geographer and librarian.

In 1592 he was appointed professor of history at Leiden University, and was elevated to full professor in 1593. From 1597 until his death he was librarian to Leiden University Library, and in 1603 he was appointed rector magnificus of the university. He was friends with Janus Dousa and Daniël Heinsius, and was a Leiden contemporary of the humanist Joseph Justus Scaliger.

His most important work was a two-part history of Holland and Guelders. He also produced the editio princeps of Williram of Ebersberg's Expositio in Cantica Canticorum, which was widely cited by 17th-century humanists.
