= Friedrich Spanheim the Younger =

German Calvinist theologian

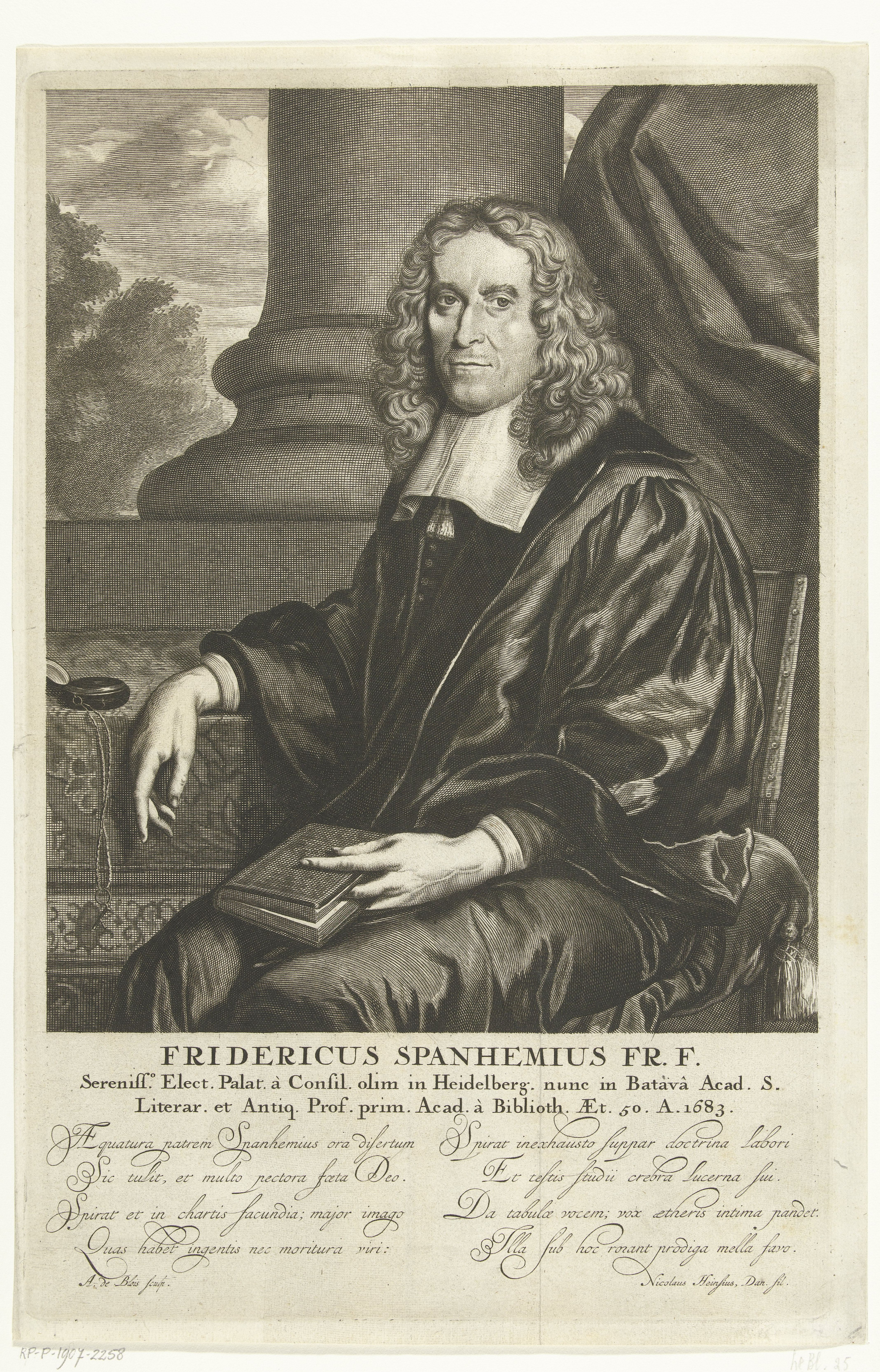
A portrait of Spanheim in 1683

Friedrich Spanheim the Younger (1 May 1632 – 18 May 1701) was a German Calvinist theologian of conservative views, son of Friedrich Spanheim.

== Life ==
He was born in Geneva, and studied at the University of Leiden, graduating M.A. in 1648. He joined the faculty of the University of Heidelberg in 1655.

In 1670 he moved to Leiden, replacing the late Johannes Cocceius as Professor of theology. Spanheim emphasised the study of church history. His theological position was expressed in dogmatic and polemical terms, as he took on Arminians, Cartesians, the followers of Cocceius and Jesuits. Spanheim encouraged the Voetians to stamp their orthodoxy on the Leiden theological faculty, and in 1676 pushed for the publication of 20 deprecated positions, marking out the Cocceian/Cartesian views. In the university Abraham Heidanus, Wittichius and Burchardus de Volder resisted strongly, and Heidanus lost his position. In the longer term, however, the Voetian victory was pyrrhic, in that Cartesianism quite soon prevailed.

Spanheim died in 1701 in Leiden.

== Works ==
His collected works were published as Opera (1701–1703).
