= Jacobus Wittichius =

German-Dutch philosopher

Jacobus Wittichius (Jacob Wittich) (1677–1739) was a German-Dutch philosopher, a Cartesian and follower of Burchard de Volder, and holder of controversial views on the nature of God.

== Life ==
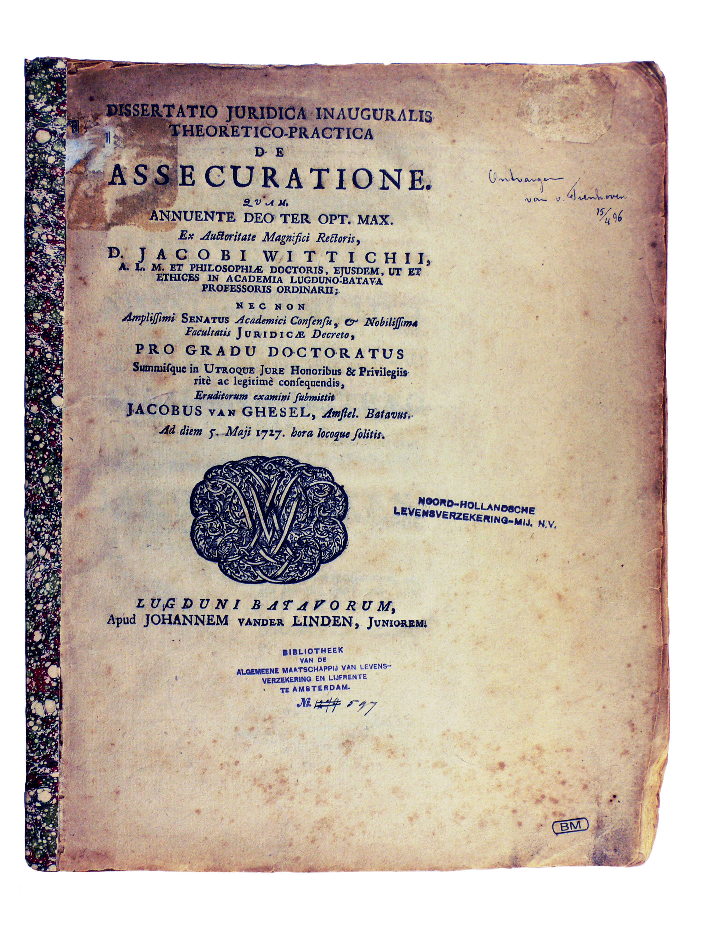
Dissertatio juridica, 1727.

He was the son of Tobias Wittich and nephew of Christophorus Wittichius, and was born in Aachen. He studied under Herman Alexander Roëll, at the University of Franeker.

A Latin dissertation at the University of Duisburg in 1711, on the nature of God, and at least nominally against Benedictus de Spinoza and Frederik van Leenhof, raised some questions about his orthodoxy. In 1717 he was a candidate for a chair at the University of Groningen, and was opposed by the theologian Antonius Driessen. Once he was given the chair, Wittichius found that Driessen continued to campaign against him, using an unauthorized Dutch translation of his Duisburg dissertation (anonymous but from the circle of Ruardus Andala); and his links to de Volder. Taco Hajo van den Honert of the University of Leiden moved in to defend Wittichius, and in the end he accepted a chair at Leiden instead. Leiden city and university now resisted outside pressure from Rotterdam in particular. Johann Franz Buddeus intervened, getting the Jena theology faculty to assert that the views of Wittichius were close to those of Spinoza and Abraham Joannes Cuffeler. Wittichius was comprehensively attacked in a pamphlet by Jacobus Leydekker in 1719. His position became a matter of wide discussion in the United Provinces; he defended himself by analogy with Johannes Bredenburg, and arguing that Cartesianism was effective against Spinozism.

Wittichius went on in combative fashion in his inaugural oration, with praise for Francis Bacon and Galileo, blame for the approach in philosophy of Gisbertus Voetius, employing Cartesian terminology, and making an allusion to Spinoza's Ethics. He continued to attack the views of Driessen and the Roëll family.
