= Salomon van Til =

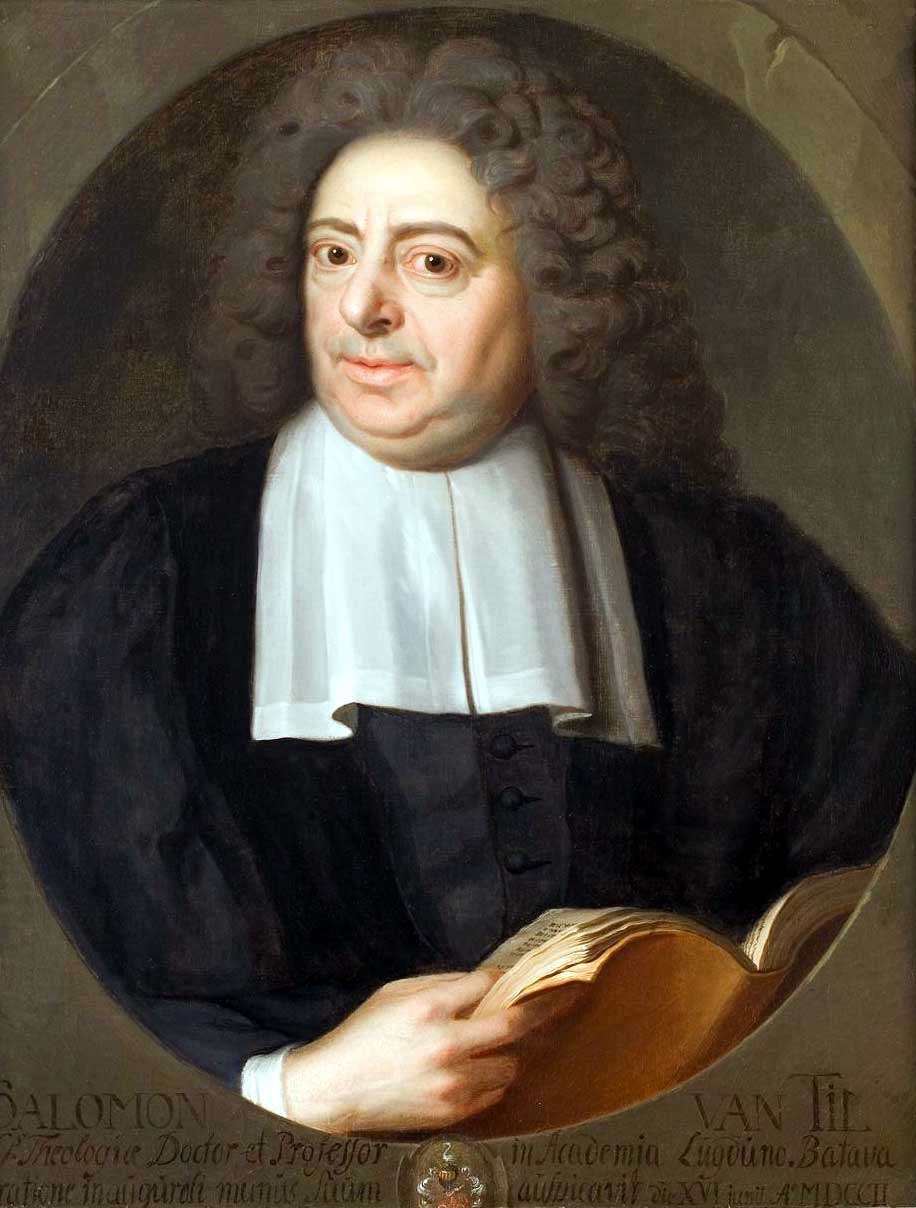
Salomon-van-Til

Salomon van Til (28 December 1643, in Weesp – 31 October 1713, in Leiden) was a theologian of the Dutch Reformed Church and a leading theological thinker of the post-Cocceius era.

== Background ==
Van Til was born in Weesp, the son of Johannes van Til and his wife Barbara le Grand. He was raised within the Dutch Reformed Church; his father was a pastor and wished for his son to follow in his foot-steps. To this end, he attended the Latin school in Alkmaar and then the University of Utrecht. A minor speech impediment forced him to focus on medicine, rather than theology, for fear that he would be unable to articulate theological concepts. But van Til remained drawn to theology and attended lectures from Cocceius, Johannes Hoornbeek, Abraham Heidanus and Jacobus Golius. He also studied philosophy, literature, oriental languages. His orthodox father originally forbade his purchasing reformist books and other material.

== Theological career ==
Having completed his studies in 1666, van Til became a pastor in Huisduinen where he spent the following eleven years devoted to further biblical and theological study. The theological disputes of his time and did not go past him. While his studies continued, his formal employment was impacted by political disputes including in 1672 when van Til was forced from office. Publicly, he returned to medicine in an effort to secure employment but he continued to preach, first in Rijpje before finally being offered a pastorate in Medemblik in 1682. In 1683 he became pastor in Dordrecht and the following year he was appointed Professor of Church History and Philology at the Illustre school there. One of his students was Johannes de Raey.

On 6 May 1702 he became a professor at Leiden University and the following 13 June he received an honorary doctorate from that institution. In 1704 or 1705 he became rector Alma Mata. In 1710 he had a stroke, after which he was paralysed. He died three years later.

== Family ==
Van Til was married twice. His first wife, Maria van Tethrode, died after 30 years of marriage in 1697. He then remarried Agatha Catharina Molenschot († 1708). His daughter Maria married Benjamin van Hess, a minister himself. His daughter Barbara married Jeronymus Jacob van Thulden, a politician from Raamsdonk. His son Jan Rochus van Til became a diplomat in Lisbon and Cologne.

== Publications ==
His works include;

- Digt-sang-en speel-Konst, soo der Ouden, als bysonder der Hebreen... (1692)
- Compendium of Natural Theology (1704)
- Dicht-, Sing- und Spiel-Kunst, sowohl der Alten als insbesonder der Hebreer (1706)
- Methodus concionandi: illustrata commentariis & exemplis (apud Jacobum van Poolsum (1717)
- Commentatio Paradoxa Historico-Chronologica De Anno, Mense Et Die Nati Christi (1740)
