= Pieter Pauw =

Dutch botanist and anatomist (1564–1617)

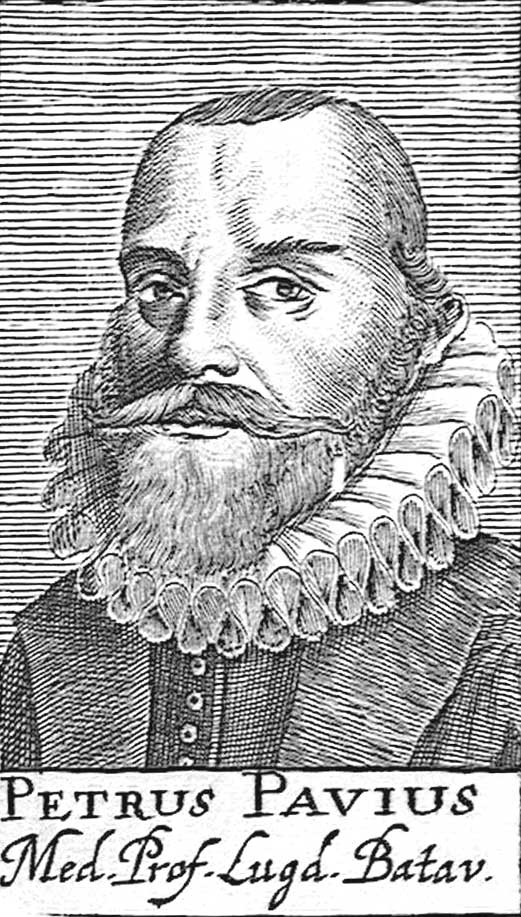
- Pieter Pauw (1564–1617)
- Born: 2 August 1564; Amsterdam
- Died: 1 August 1617 (aged 52); Leiden
- Education: University of Leiden
- Known for: First Anatomy Professor at University of Leiden
- Scientific career
- Fields: Botany, Anatomy
- Workplaces: University of Leiden

Pieter Pauw (Latin: Petrus Pavius), (2 August 1564 – 1 August 1617) was a Dutch botanist and anatomist. He was a student of Hieronymus Fabricius. He was the first Anatomy Professor at University of Leiden.

== Biography ==
He was the son of Pieter Pauw Adriaanszoon who settled in Amsterdam, then later in Alkmaar.

Pauw graduated in Medicine on 2 November 1581 to 1584 at Leiden University, then remained known as the High School in Leiden. After graduating, he went abroad. He then went to Rostock, where he took classes of Henricus Brucaeus. He received his doctorate in 1587. He then spent three months in the northern Italian city of Padua and he was taught by Hieronymus Fabricius, but his father's illness forced him to go back to Netherlands.

On 9 February 1589 he went to Leiden to work as a full professor, to assist Gerard de Bondt. Pauw took from 10 October 1598, along with De Bondt care of management and maintenance of the Hortus Botanicus of Leiden. The tree species Aesculus pavia (a type of horse chestnut) were named after Pauw by Herman Boerhaave. He, in the early eighteenth century, was the director of this garden. On 10 May 1592 he was appointed full professor.

In 1596 or 1597 Pauw made the first anatomical theater in the Netherlands, called Theatrum anatomicum. Ten years earlier, De Bondt started anatomy lectures in Leiden, but Pauw was the first to appear publicly decomposing for his classes. These dissections attracted much attention and were not only visited by students, but also by non-students who had to pay an entrance fee of fifteen pence. The medical faculty was not taught during the lectures. Pauw and his colleagues used the corpses of executed criminals for these colleges.

He provided the theater with a collection of unique objects, including the bladder of Isaac Casaubon.

He was given a professorship in medicine in 1599 by Aelius Everhardus Vorstius, who took after Pauw's death in 1617 the care of the garden that Pauw made in 1617 shortly before his death. Was re-issued the Epitome of Andreas Vesalius. The Epitome is a custom for students version of De humani corporis fabrica libri septem and Pauw added his own annotations to it.

== Works ==
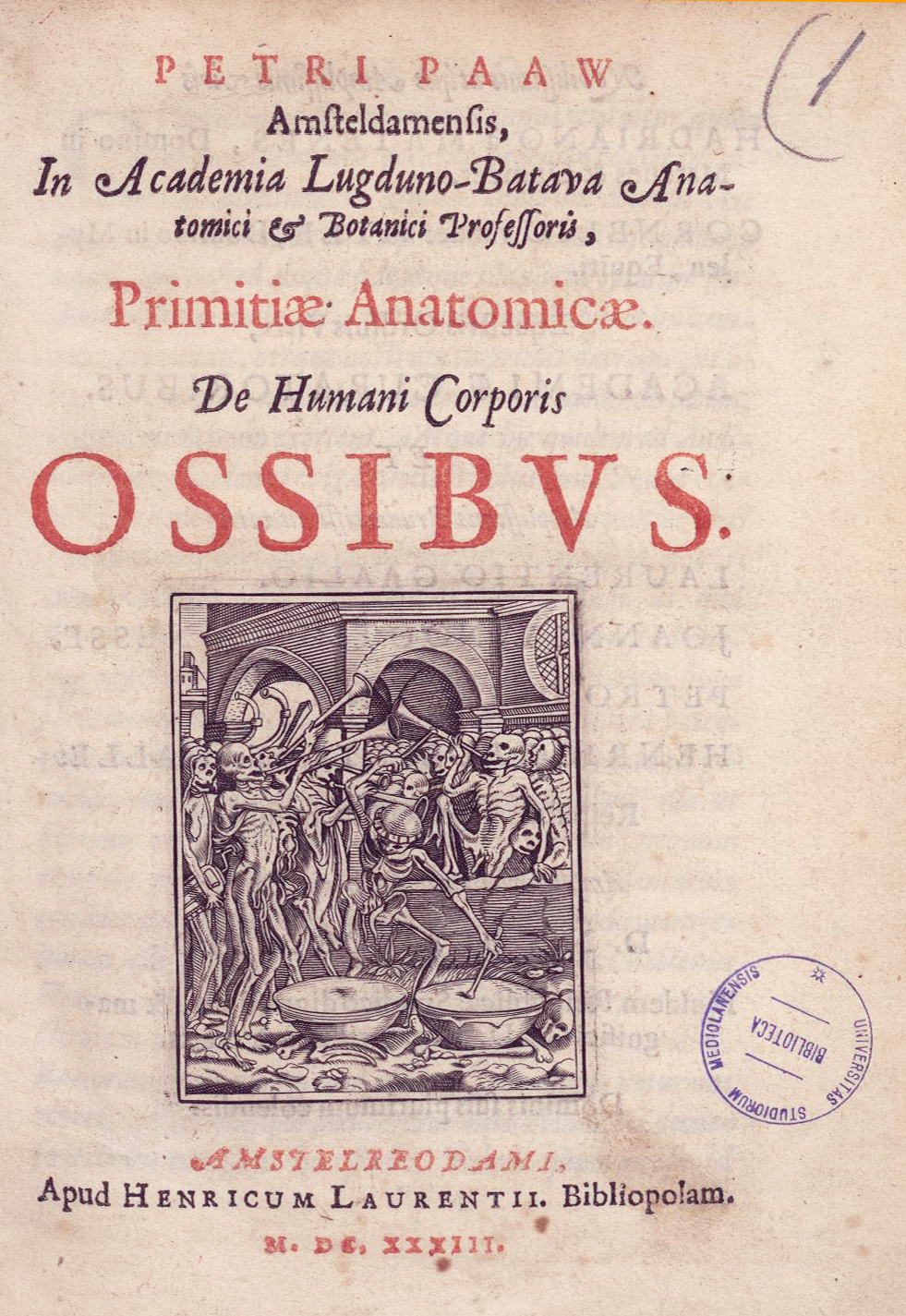
Primitiae anatomicae de humani corporis ossibus, 1633

- Pieter Paaw, Hortus publicus Academiae lugduno-batavae... opera Petri Paawii,..., Lugduni Batavorum : ex officina J. Patii, 1603;
- Pieter Paaw, Theses medicae de asthmate, quas,..., Lugduni Batavorum : Ex officina Ioannis Patii, 1605;
- Piter Paaw, Petri Paaw Amsteldamensis, in Academia Lugduno-Batava anatomici & botanici professoris, Primitiae anatomicae. De humani corporis ossibus, Lugduni Batavorum. Ex officina Justi à Colster, 1615;
- Piter Paaw, Petri Paaw Primitiae anatomicae de humani corporis ossibus , Lugd. Bat., 1615;
- Pieter Pauw (1616). De capitis vulneribus (in Latin). Leiden: Joost van Colster.
- Pieter Pauw (1633). Primitiae anatomicae de humani corporis ossibus (in Latin). Amsterdam: Hendrick Laurensz.
