= Sebald Justinus Brugmans =

Dutch botanist and physician

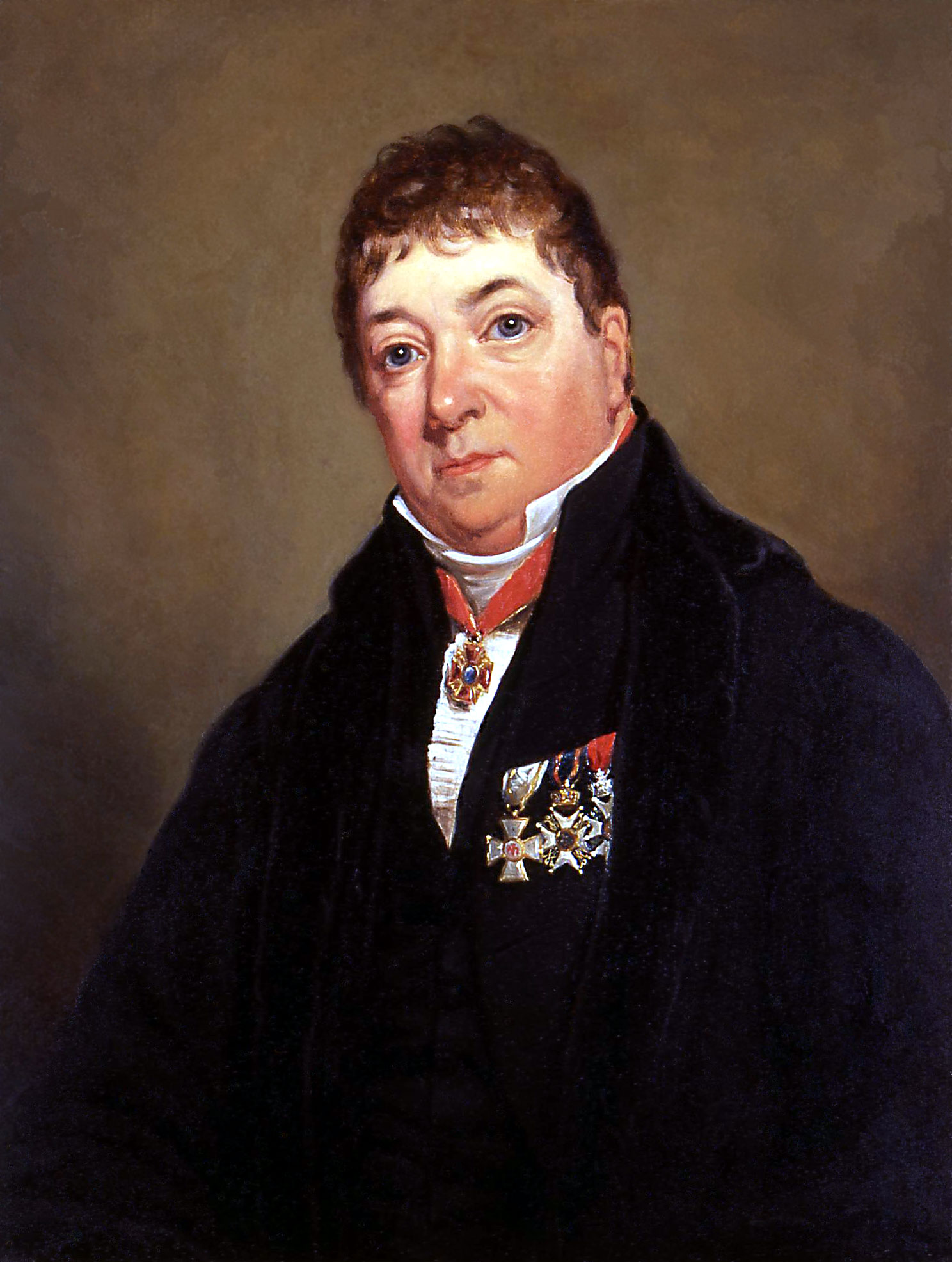
Sebald Justinus Brugmans

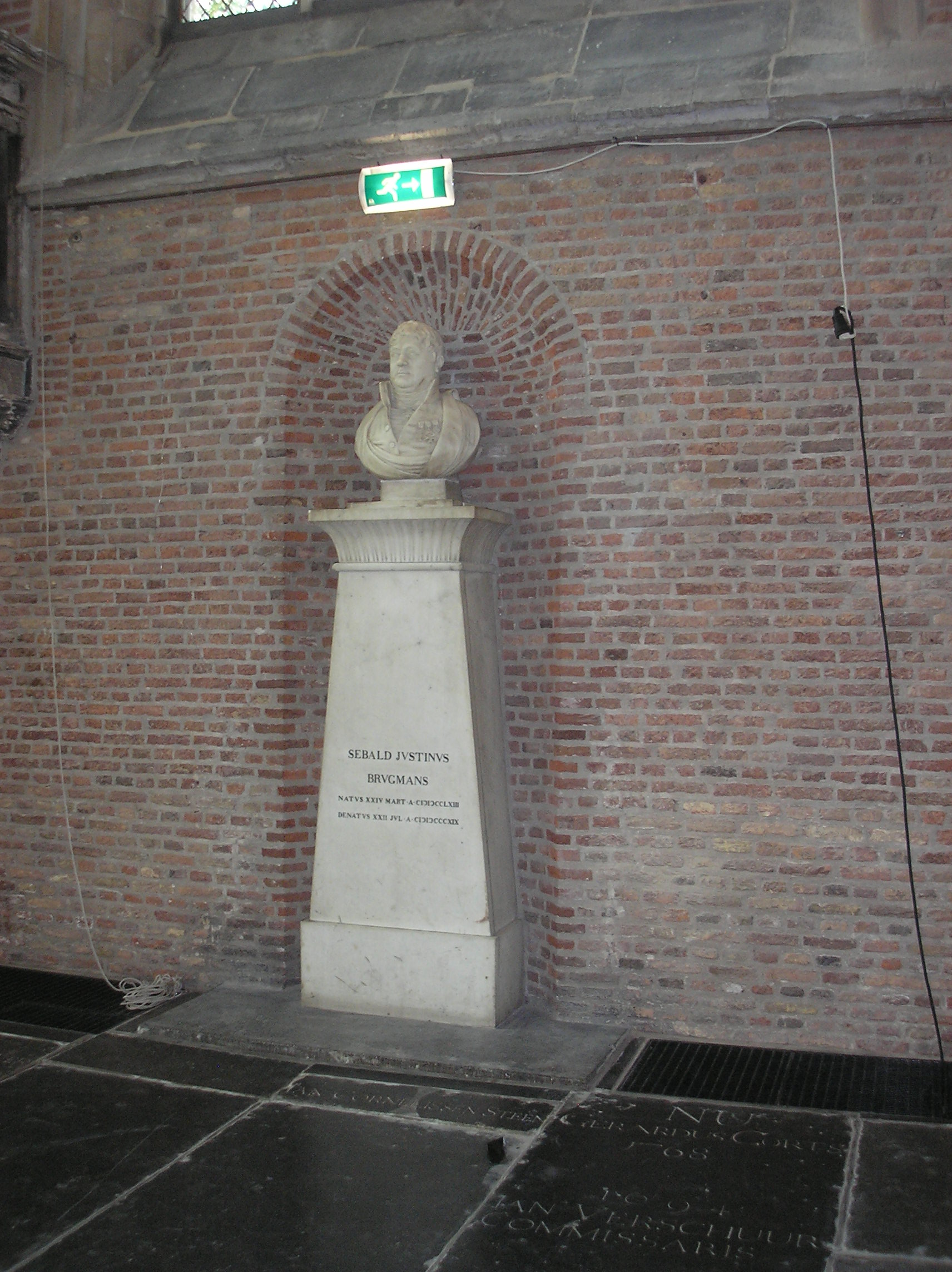
Monument in Pieterskerk Leyden

Sebald Justinus Brugmans (24 March 1763, Franeker – 22 July 1819, Leiden) was a Dutch botanist and physician. He was the son of naturalist Anton Brugmans (1732–1789).

Brugmans studied philosophy, mathematics and physics at the Universities of Franeker and Groningen, earning his doctorate in 1781. In 1785 he became a professor at Franeker, where he taught classes in physics, astronomy, logic and metaphysics. During the following year, he succeeded David van Royen (1727–1799) as professor of botany at the University of Leiden. At Leiden, he also served as director of the "Hortus Botanicus Leiden". In 1791, he transferred from the Faculty of Philosophy to that of Medicine, of which, from 1795, included the field of chemistry. Brugmans was very interested in the connection that exists between chemistry and medicine.

In 1794, when Holland became a refuge for retreating English and Hanoverian armies, he, along with physicians and medical students at Leiden, set up emergency hospital services outside the city. He repeated this activity in 1799 (for English and Russian forces north of present-day IJmuiden), and in 1809 (bombardment of Vlissingen by the British Navy).

In 1795, he was put in charge of the military medical service of the newly founded Batavian Republic. His outstanding work as a physician came to the attention of Louis Bonaparte, as well as to his more famous brother, who promoted him to seventh inspector-general of the Grande Armee. Later on, the first king of the Netherlands, William I, restored Brugmans to his former functions, while giving him additional duties as inspector-general of the military service, the supervision of the Navy and the Colonies, of the military veterinary service, and of sanitary conditions in prisons and quarantine stations.

As a military physician, he was dedicated towards the improvement of hospital and barrack facilities. In these endeavors, he stressed the importance of cleanliness and hygiene, and strove to prevent the spread of contagious disease. He is especially remembered for his expertise in the treatment of gangrene.

A genus of subtropical flowering plants known as Brugmansia is named after him.
