= Dionysius Godefridus van der Keessel =

Dutch jurist

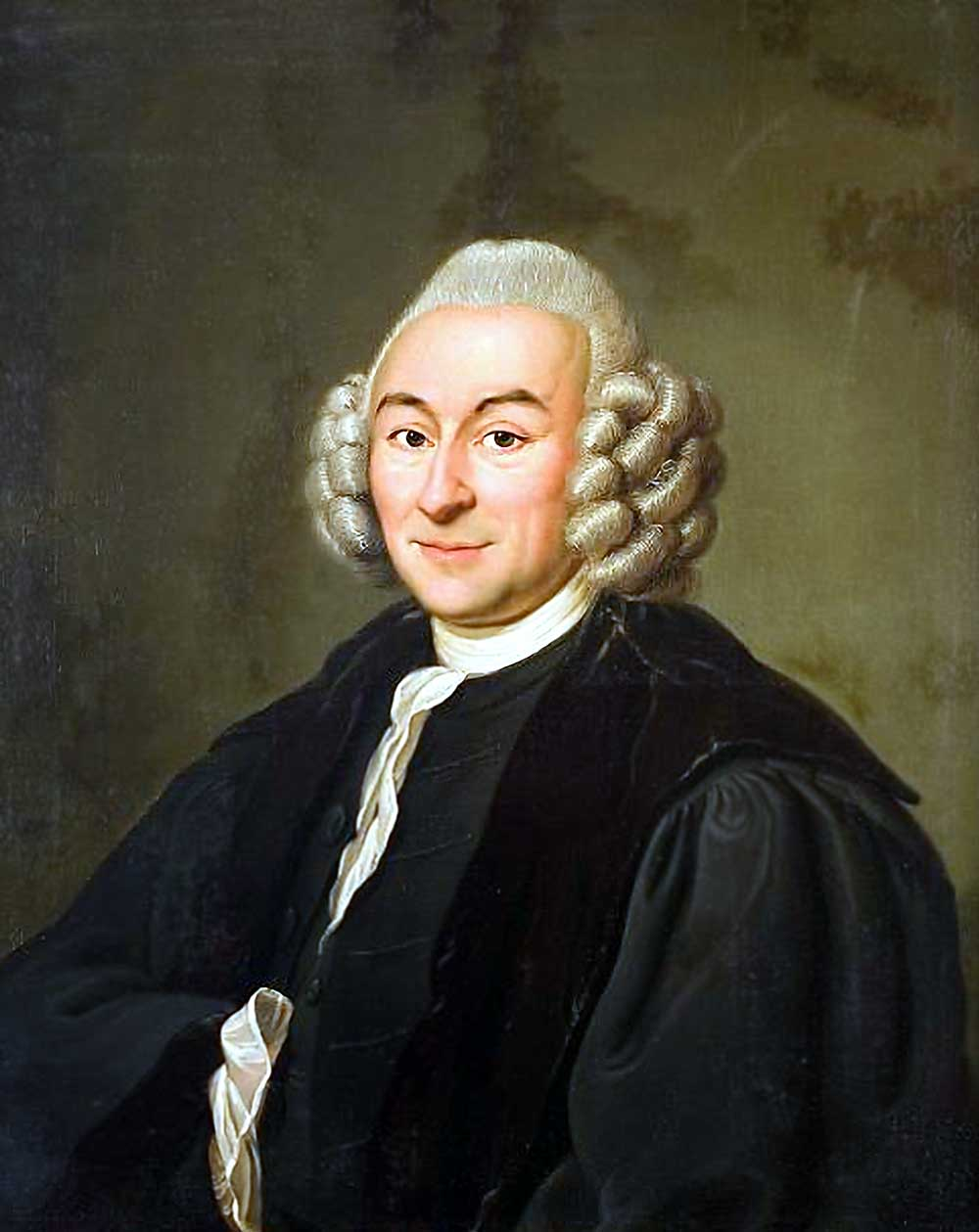
Dionysius Godefridus van der Keessel, 1780

Dionysius Godefridus van der Keessel (22 September 1738 – 7 August 1816) was a Dutch jurist.

He was born and educated in Deventer. He then practiced law in The Hague, and was appointed professor in Groningen in 1762, and in Leiden in 1770, where he taught until 1815. He was the tutor of the future king William I from 1789 to 1790; William honored Van der Keessel with the Order of the Netherlands Lion. He died in Leiden.

Although a well-known scholar in his lifetime, Van der Keessel did not publish much of significance, but several of his lectures on Roman-Dutch law were republished in English in the 20th century because of their significance for South African law.
