= Otto Heurnius =

Dutch physicist, theologian, and philosopher (1577–1652)

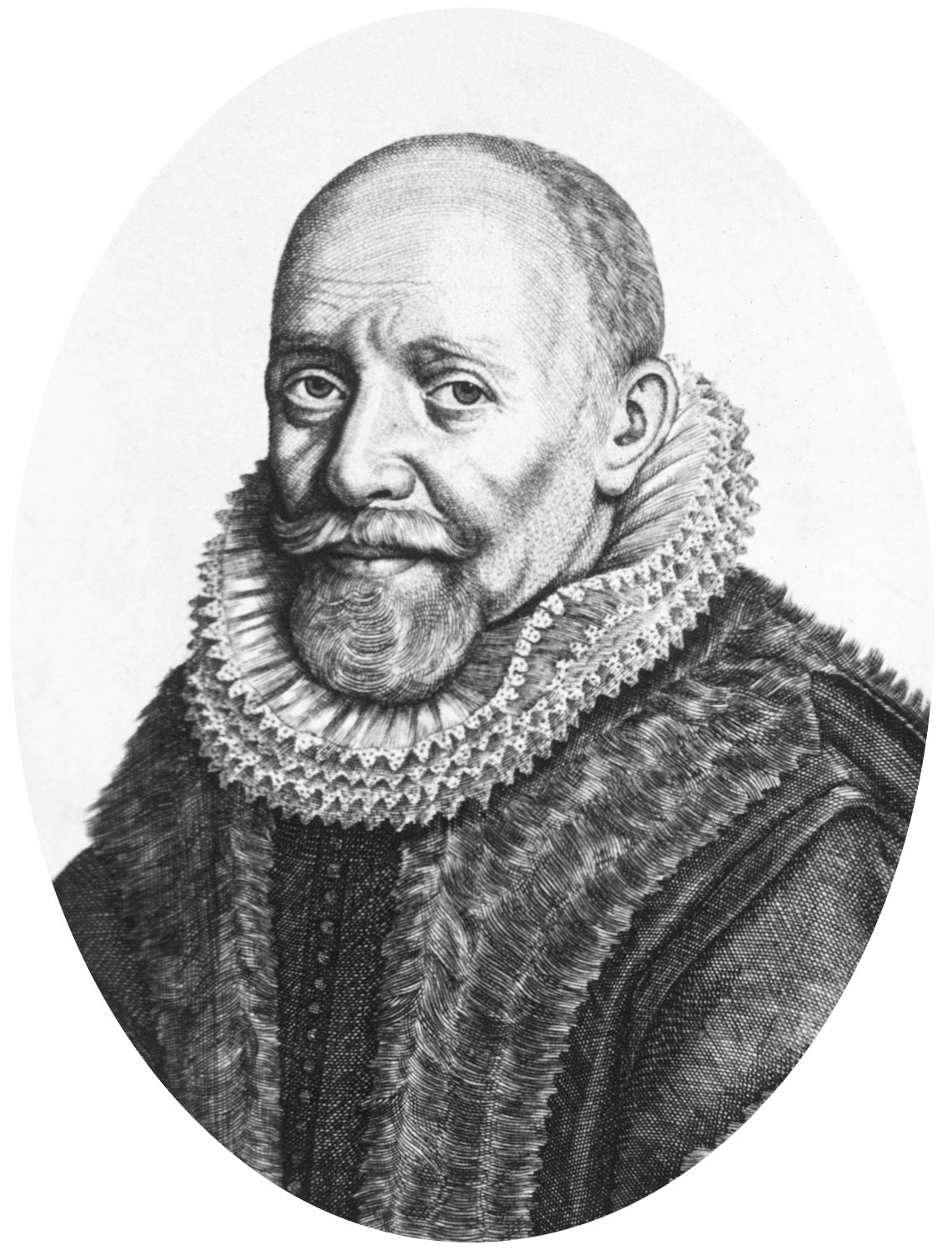
- Born: Otto van Heurn; 8 September 1577; Utrecht, Spanish Netherlands
- Died: 14 July 1652 (aged 74); Leiden, Dutch Republic
- Education: Leiden University
- Scientific career
- Fields: Medicine
- Workplaces: Leiden University
- Doctoral advisor: Johannes Heurnius; Pierre Du Moulin
- Doctoral students: Henricus Regius; Johannes Walaeus
- Other notable students: Franciscus Sylvius

Otto Heurnius (born Otto van Heurn; 8 September 1577 – 14 July 1652) was a Dutch physician, theologian and philosopher.

== Life ==
He studied at Leiden University. He subsequently succeeded his father Johannes Heurnius as professor of medicine at Leiden University, and took over anatomy teaching from Pieter Pauw from 1617. Alongside his practical anatomy teaching, he had the care of a very various collection of zoological and botanical specimens. The aims of the collection included reconstruction of the life of the Israelites in Egypt, as in the Book of Exodus.

He was also a historian of philosophy, stressing the period before the philosophers of the Ancient Greeks ("barbarian philosophy"). He based his ideas on the Corpus Hermeticum.
