= Franco Burgersdijk =

Dutch logician

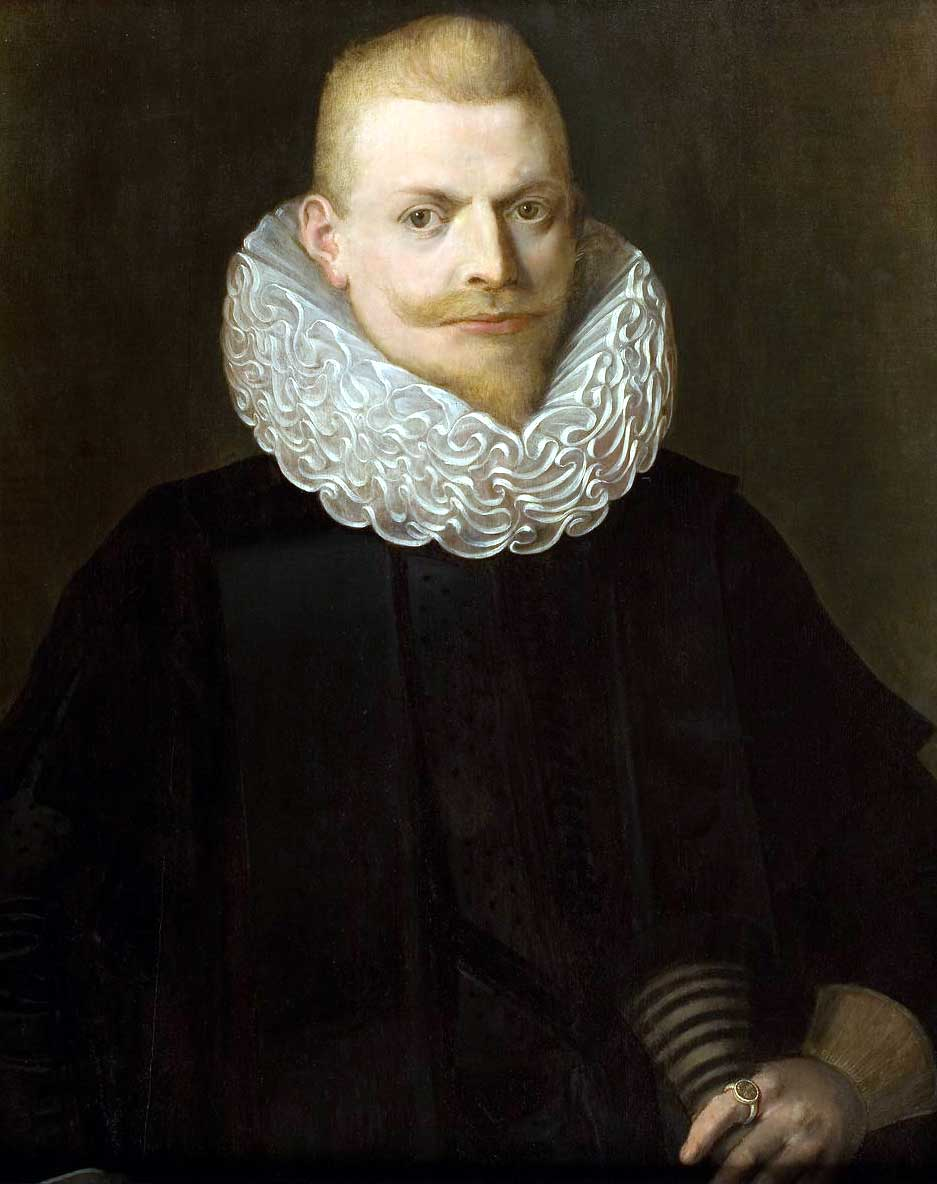
- Portrait of Burgersdijk
- Born: 3 May 1590
- Died: 19 February 1635 (aged 44)
- Occupation: Rector at Leiden University

Academic work
- Discipline: Logic, moral philosophy

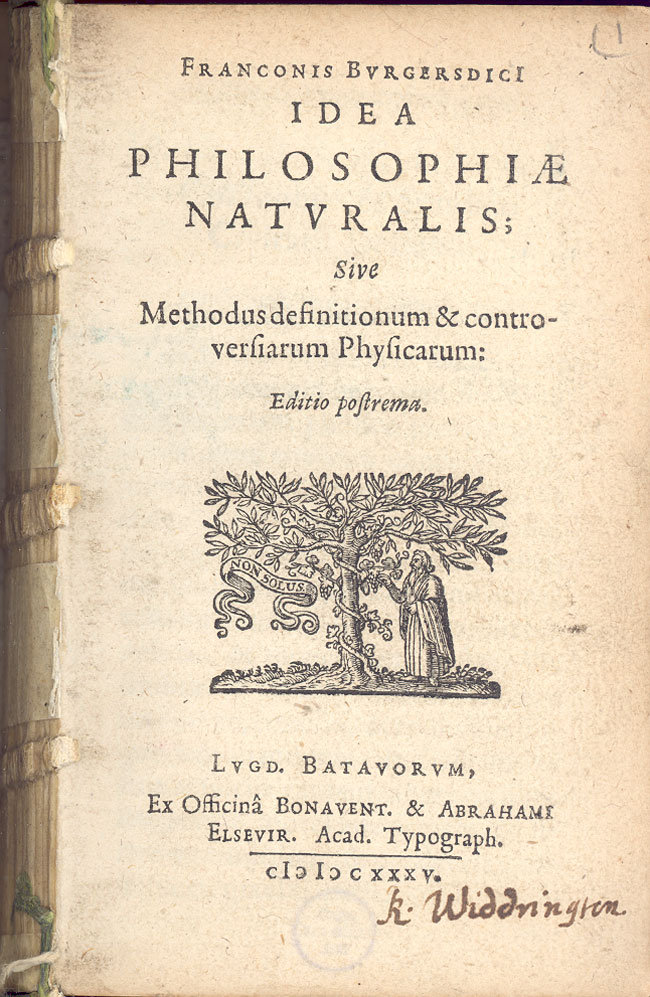
Idea philosophiae naturalis (Leiden, Elzevier, 1635)

Franco Petri Burgersdijk, or Franciscus Burgersdicius (born Franck Pieterszoon Burgersdijk; 3 May 1590 – 19 February 1635), was a Dutch logician who worked as a professor of logic and moral philosophy and rector at Leiden University. Franco Burgersdijk's teaching helped raise the profile of logic and philosophy in Dutch universities.

== Life ==
Franco Burgersdijk was born on 3 May 1590, in De Lier. Burgersdijk spent much of his childhood on a farm, and attended the Latin Schools at both Amersfoort (1604—1606) and Delft Gymnasium (1606—1610). Shortly after, he decided to study theology at the University of Leiden. His growing interest in debate led him to become a mentee of Gisbertus Voetius, the vice principal of Staten Collegie. After finishing his education in Leiden, he further pursued his studies at the University of Saumur where he became a professor of philosophy in 1614. After the Arminian "purification" of universities of the Dutch Republic, Burgersdijk relocated back to Holland and became a professor of logic at the University of Leiden. He was later appointed as the chair of ethics and then exchanged it for the chair of philosophy. He died in Leiden.

The reason for Burgersdijk's popularity stems from his first book, Idea Philosophiae Naturalis, which became the model for his later writings. His treatment of his subjects is clear, logical, concise and well organized. The method of orderly study he employed was designed to instill "sound scholarship". Starting from his method of definition and classification, he examined the whole of natural philosophy in 26 disputations, each of which presented a set of theses that could be further examined by consulting the listed pros and cons instances. Another collection of disputations took place in the Collegium physicum. Burgersdijk's reputation in the 17th century rested on his systematic manuals. They received their pedagogical importance from the efficient adaptation of the Corpus Aristotelicum to the standards of the humanistic method. Burgersdijk's neo-Aristotelianism is related to the Contra-Remonstrant movement in the Dutch Republic.

=== Religious troubles and their effect on Burgersdijk's Academic Career ===
During the truce between the Dutch and Spanish armies in 1609, followers of theology professor Jacob Arminius requested the States of Holland to review certain religious issues. These issues consisted of a series of conflicts between Arminians, followers of Jacob Arminius, and Gomarists, followers of Fransicus Gomarus. These conflicts arose due to different interpretations of the holy scripture.

Their debate was deeply entangled in Dutch politics for years. In 1608, conflicts escalated when the Staats General (general assembly) of the Federal Dutch state requested a synod; this was opposed by the Province of Holland, which supported the Arminians. In response, the Province of Holland used its military power to restore order. However, this brought them into conflict with the Stadtholder Maurice, Prince of Orange, who staged a coup and gained control of the entire country, thus ending the political skirmish. The religious conflict shortly ended after the international Synod of Dort ruled in favor of Gomarists on May 9, 1619.

Due to the ruling, all Arminianism was effectively removed from the Republic. The removal brought about openings at the University of Leiden. Burgersdijk saw this as an opportunity to go back to Holland. He was appointed a professor of logic and was later promoted to the chair of ethics. His studies of theological education were completed in 1623.

In 1626, Burgersdijk was tasked with editing Johannes de Sacrobosco’s De sphaera to rid the book of its Latin.

=== Interest in Philosophy ===
Burgersdijk participated in two disputes in 1623 and 1627 which involved the Aristotelian knowledge corpus on natural knowledge. His former professor and the chair of philosophy at the University of Leiden, Jacchaeus (Gilbert Jack), quarreled with Burgersdijk because he believed that Burgersdijk was exceeding the remit of his department. After Jacchaeus's death in 1628, Burgersdijk exchanged his chair of ethics for the chair of philosophy.

Although Burgersdijk was known to believe in Aristotelian principles, he also believed in the birth of new stars and the supernatural effects of the heavens on the terrestrial world.

=== Career ===
He received his first appointment at the Protestant Academy of Saumur, where he was professor of philosophy from 1616 to 1619. He returned to Leiden as a professor of logic and ethics and gave his inaugural lecture "De fructu et utilitate logices" in 1620. Appointed to the chair of philosophy in 1628, Burgersdijk became a leading figure at the university, serving as rector (1629, 1630, 1634) and writing influential textbooks on natural philosophy, metaphysics, logic, ethics, and politics.

=== Accomplishments ===
In 1625 new regulations were issued. Some ethics, physics, and geography could be taught in the final year, and Burgersdijk was asked to elevate the medieval 'barbaric' Latin of Johannes de Sacrobosco's De sphaera to humanistic standards by making 'astronomy' clear and easy to understand. This textbook, commissioned by the Dutch States, should not be taken as an illustration of Burgersdijk's conservatism. The aim was to familiarize the students with the "basics" of the subject, which, as stated in the introduction to the compendium, would have to be deepened at the university. In 1628, after the death of Jacchaeus, Burgersdijk exchanged moral philosophy for physics, but long before that he lectured on physics. In 1624 a first series of fifteen disputations dealing with the Aristotelian corpus of natural philosophy was held, and in 1627 the next series was organized. Although his orator Petrus Cunaeus noted that several friends of the deceased were astonished at this move, for "the moral philosophy transmitted from heaven to earth by Socrates is the most outstanding part of philosophy", he remarked Burgersdijk's humanistic ambition to that hidden in nature Truth, that a clear light may shine out of the darkness." He therefore clarified the Aristotelian philosophy taught "by public authority" in the schools and removed "its obscurities', which were later intensified "scholastic 'Commentators such as Thomas Aquinas and John Duns Scotus.' Thus, Burgersdijk's key terms are method and system, with order being a necessary condition of a science.

== Works ==
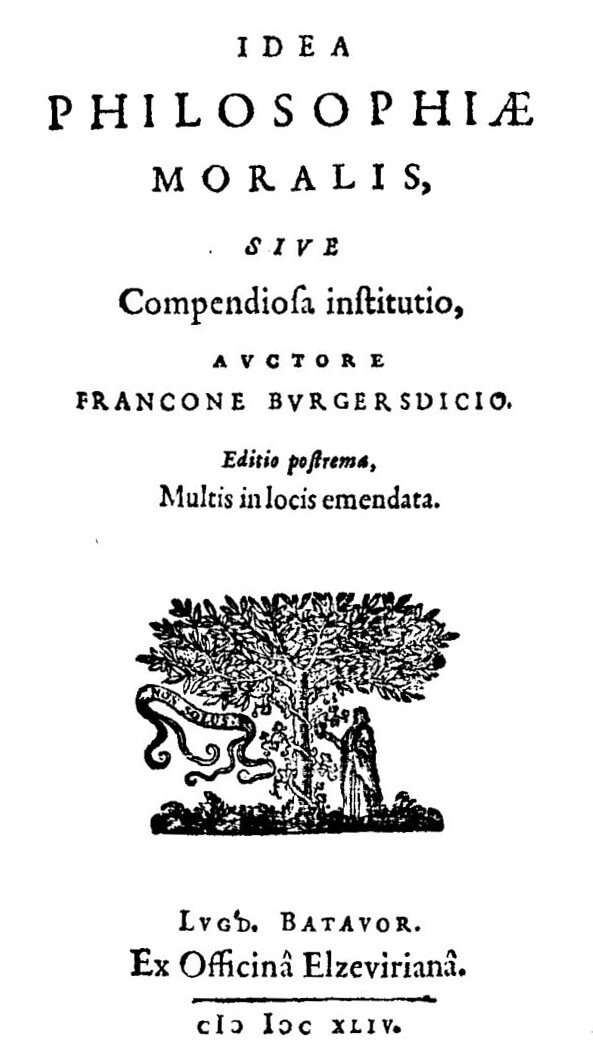
Idea philosophiae moralis, 1644

Burgersdijk was well known for his compendium of logic. He wrote the Institutionum logicarum, in two books, which emphasized order and method. He took inspiration from Aristotle, but he also followed the methods of Petrus Ramus.

Burgersdijk's second compendium was of moral and political thought. This compendium was also heavily influenced by Aristotle.

- Idea philosophiae naturalis. (Leiden, 1622)
- Idea philosophiae moralis. (Leiden, 1623)
- Institutionum logicarum libri duo. (Leiden, 1626)
- Idea philosophiae tum naturalis, tum moralis. (Oxford, 1631)
- Institutionum logicarum synopsis. (Leiden, 1632)
- Collegium physicum, disputationibus XXXII. absolutum. (Leiden, 1637)
- Institutionum metaphysicarum libri duo. (Leiden, 1640)
- Idea oeconomicae et politicae doctrinae. (Leiden, 1644)
