= Jan Hendrik Scholten =

Dutch Protestant theologian (1811–1885)

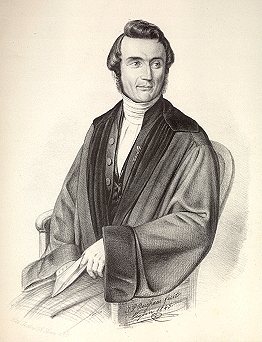
Jan Hendrik Scholten

Jan Hendrik Scholten (born Johannes Heinrich Scholten, 17 August 1811, Vleuten – 10 April 1885, Leiden), Dutch Protestant theologian, was born at Vleuten near Utrecht.

== Biography ==
After studying at Utrecht University, he was appointed professor of theology in 1840 at Franeker. From Franeker in 1843 he went to Leiden as professor extraordinarius, and in 1845 was promoted to the rank of ordinarius. Through Scholten, Abraham Kuenen became interested in theology; Scholten was not then the radical theologian he became later. The two scholars in course of time created a movement resembling that of the Tübingen School in Germany. From his theology there "began to rise a different type of spirit, the spirit of absolute antisupernaturalism of the German idealistic kind."

Pursuing first the study of dogmatic theology and the philosophy of religion, Scholten published a work on the Principles of the Theology of the Reformed Church (2 vols, 1848–1850, 4th ed. 1861–1862). He then gave special attention to the New Testament, and wrote A Critical Study of the Gospel of John (1864, in German 1867).

Scholten's other works include:

- Historical and Critical Introduction to the New Testament (1853–1856)
- The Oldest Witnesses to the Writings of the New Testament (1866)
- The Oldest Gospel (1868)
- The Pauline Gospel (1870)
- A Comparative View of Religions

An account of his theological development is given in Afscheidsrede bij het Neerleggen van het Hoogleeraarsambt (1881), and in the biography written by A Kuenen, Levensbericht van J. Henricus Scholten (1885).

He became member of the Royal Netherlands Academy of Arts and Sciences in 1856.
