= Arnold Vinnius =

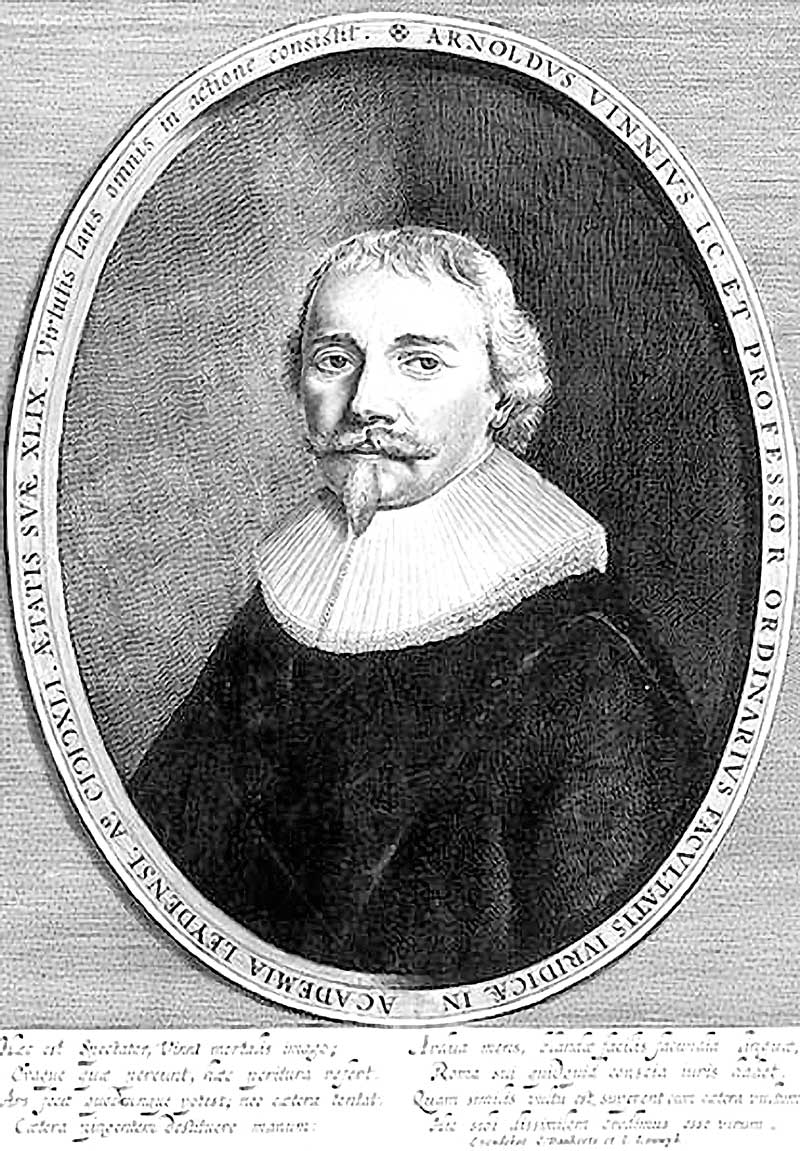
Arnold Vinnius

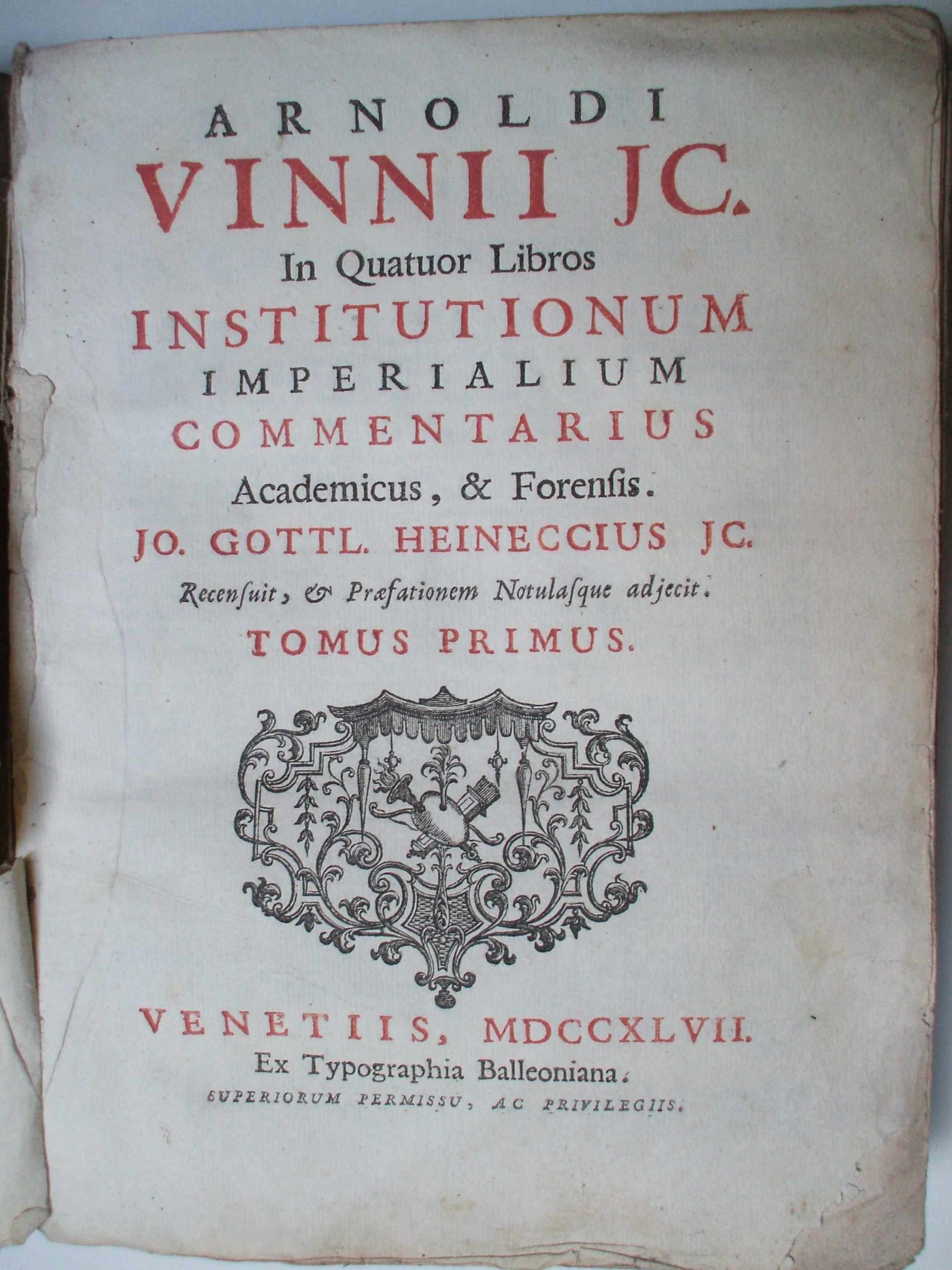
Arnold Vinnius comments

Arnold Vinnius (4 January 1588 – 1 September 1657) was a Dutch jurist and writer.

== Life ==
Vinnius was born in Monster. He attended the University of Leiden from 1603 where he read law. He gained his degree in 1612. His most important teacher was Gerardus Tuningius, who had been a student of Hugo Donellus. Vinnius aspired to an academic career, and in 1618 began teaching at the University of Leiden. He was initially not considered for promotion to a professorship as he had previously expressed pejorative views on the professors, so it was not until 1633 the position of Extraordinarius Professor Institutionum was created for him. He retained his position as professor until his death in Leiden.

== Teaching and works ==
In Vinnius' doctrine, the influence of Hugo Donellus is noticeable. Unlike the medieval glossators, he presented a systematic and coherent body of Law.

A prolific author, he published Iurisprudentiae contractae sive Partitionum iuris civilis libri IIII ("Jurisprudence abridged, or the Partitions of civil law in four books") (The Hague, 1624-1631); a series of short treatises on contracts, jurisdiction, inheritance, and compromise, in 1644 and 1646 (later united in a single volume and reprinted many times under the title Tractatus IV de pactis, jurisdictione, collationibus, transactionibus; Amsterdam, 1651); his extremely popular "Notes" to the Institutes of Justinian (Leiden, 1646); and a volume of selected questions on civil law (Selectarum iuris quaestionum..., Leiden, 1653). He also prepared annotated reprints of Petrus Peck's commentary on maritime law and Matthaeus Wesenbeck's Paratitla, in addition to his 1618 edition of the Institutes of his master, Gerardus Tuningius. Vinnius’ works enjoyed an unprecedented diffusion throughout Europe, with 154 editions.

More than one-third of these editions were versions of his best-seller, In quatuor libros Institutionum imperialium commentarius academicus et forensis. This work was reprinted 54 times from the first 1642 Leiden edition to the 1867 Spanish translation (which is a reprint of the 1846 translation with added notes on Catalan laws, published in Barcelona). Further reproductions of his work are hidden beneath different covers, such as the Institutes by Torres y Velasco (Madrid, 1735) and the Institutes by Juan Sala y Bañuls (printed in 1788, 1795, 1805, 1824, 1830), which were little more than abbreviations of his "Vinnius castigatus" of 1779 under a new title page. The first Spanish edition was printed in 1723 and was corrected according to the 1707 Index of forbidden and expurgated books (Index librorum prohibitorum et expurgandorum).

The philosopher David Hume recalled being required to read Vinnius while studying Law in Edinburgh.
