= Adolphus Vorstius =

Dutch physician and botanist

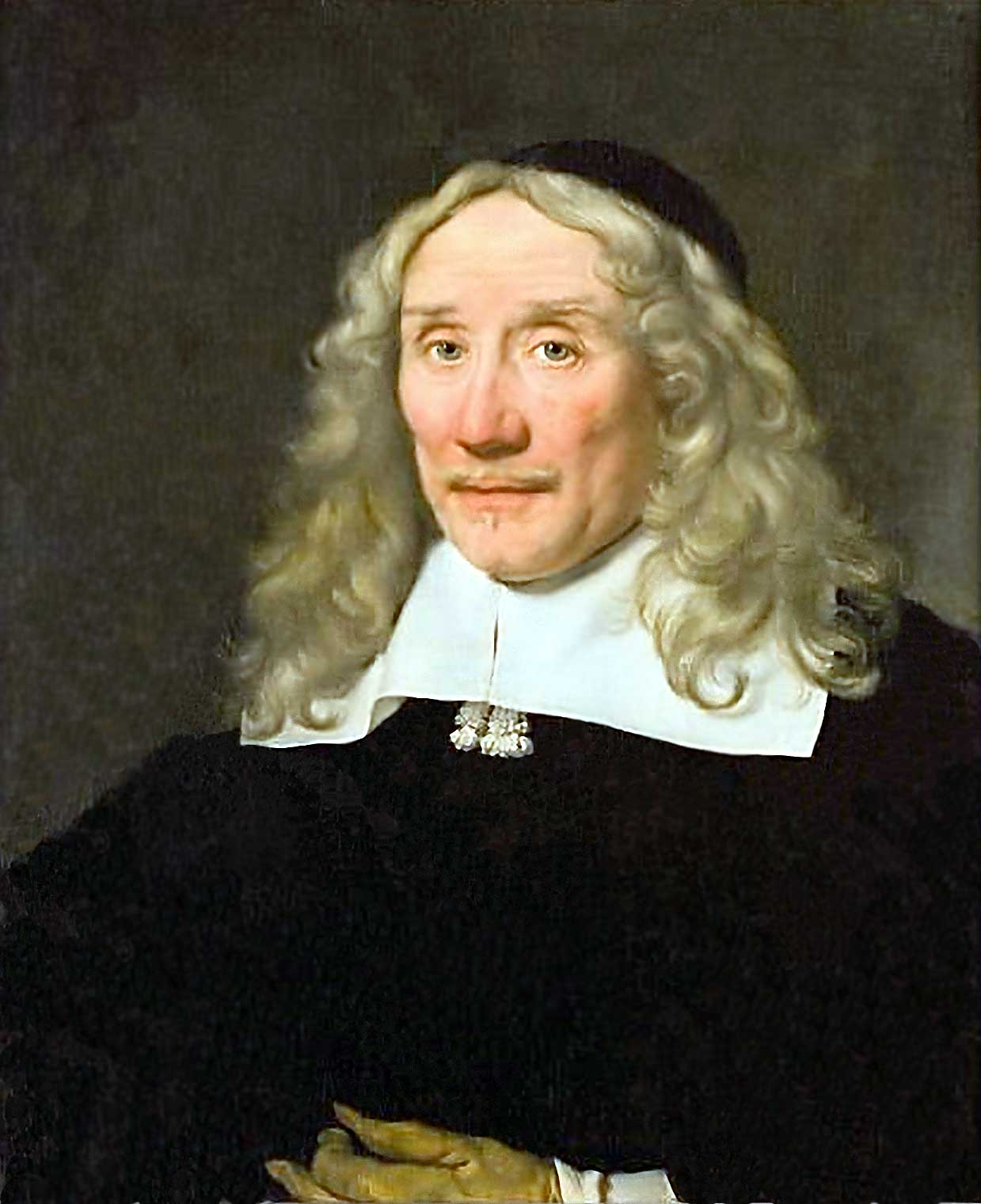
Adolphus Vorstius

Adolphus Vorstius (born Adolphe Vorst; 18 November 1597, Delft – 9 October 1663, Leiden) was a Dutch physician and botanist.

== Life ==
He was the son of Aelius Everhardus Vorstius and his wife. After attending the Latin School in Leiden, he enrolled in the University of Leiden in 1612. Here, he learned Greek under Henricus Bredius and Bonaventura Vulcanius, and studied the writings of Homer and Lucian. He also attended the lectures of Petrus Cunaeus, Daniel Heinsius, and employed to Thomas Erpenius with the Arabic language These language studies were designed to expand his possibilities in the study of botany. He also graduated from the then usual studies such as music, art and natural history.

After he had defended a De Motu under Gilbert Jack, he spent seven years on a grand tour. This led him to Belgian, British, French and Italian universities. After further studies under Paul Reneaulme in Blois, he earned his medical doctorate at the University of Padua under Adriaan van den Spiegel on 20 August 1622. Returned home, he received from the Regent Maurice of Orange an appointment as associate professor of medicine at the University of Leiden; an office he stepped up to on 10 February 1624.

On 13 May 1625 he became a full professor of medicine and botany, to which the management of the Hortus Botanicus was connected. For this, he produced a catalog that captured the continuous growth of the botanical garden. In addition, he also participated in the organizational tasks of the University of Leiden and was in the years 1636, 1652 and 1660 rector of the Alma Mater. A stone disease ended his life at the age of sixty-two.

In October 1626 he married Catherine van der Meulen (d. 1652), daughter of Daniel van der Meulen and Esther de la Faille. The marriage did produce children. His son Eberhard is known.

== Works ==
- Recognitio versionis Ioannis Obsapaei aphorismorum Hippocratis. Leiden 1628
- Oratio funebris in obitum Gilberti Iacchaei cum variorum epicediis. Leiden 1628
- Oratio funebris recitata in exequiis Petri Cunai. Leiden 1638
- Catalogus plantarum horti Academici Lugdono-Bataui, quibus in instructus erat anno 1642. Accessit index plantatum indigenarum, quae prope Lugdunum in Batauis nascuntur. Leiden 1643
- Oratio funebris in excessum Claudii Salmasii habita. Leiden 1652
- Harangue funèbre sur la mort de l'imcomparable Claude de Soumaize. Leiden 1663 (Online)

In addition, his name is connected with a variety of disputations that arose through his teachings.

== Literature ==
- August Hirsch, Albrecht Wernich, Ernst Julius Gurlt: Biographisches Lexikon der hervorragenden Ärzte aller Zeiten und Völker. Verlag Urban & Schwarzenberg, Wien und Leipzig 1888, 6. Bd., S. 153
- "Entry". Zedlers Universallexikon. Vol. 50. p. 660.
- Adolphus Vorstius at the Mathematics Genealogy Project
- Christian Gottlieb Jöcher: Allgemeines Gelehrten-Lexicon, Darinne die Gelehrten aller Stände sowohl männ- als weiblichen Geschlechts, welche vom Anfange der Welt bis auf die ietzige Zeit gelebt, und sich der gelehrten Welt bekannt gemacht, Nach ihrer Geburt, Leben, merckwürdigen Geschichten, Absterben und Schrifften aus den glaubwürdigsten Scribenten in alphabetischer Ordnung beschrieben werden. Verlag Johann Friedrich Gleditsch, Leipzig 1751, Bd. 4, Sp. 1710
- Johann Peter Niceron: Nachrichten von den Begebenheiten und Schriften berümter Gelehrten. Verlag Christoph Peter Franken, Halle/Saale 1758, Band 16, S. 219 f. (Online)
- Henning Witte: Memoriae medicorum nostri seculi clarissimorum renovatae decas prima (- secunda). Hallervord, Königsberg und Frankfurt (Main) 1676, S. 222 (Online bei MATEO)
- Abraham Jacob van der Aa: Biographisch Woordenboek der Nederlanden. Verlag J. J. van Brederode, Haarlem 1876, Bd. 19, S. 369 (Online)
