= Hieronymus David Gaubius =

German physician and chemist (1705–1780)

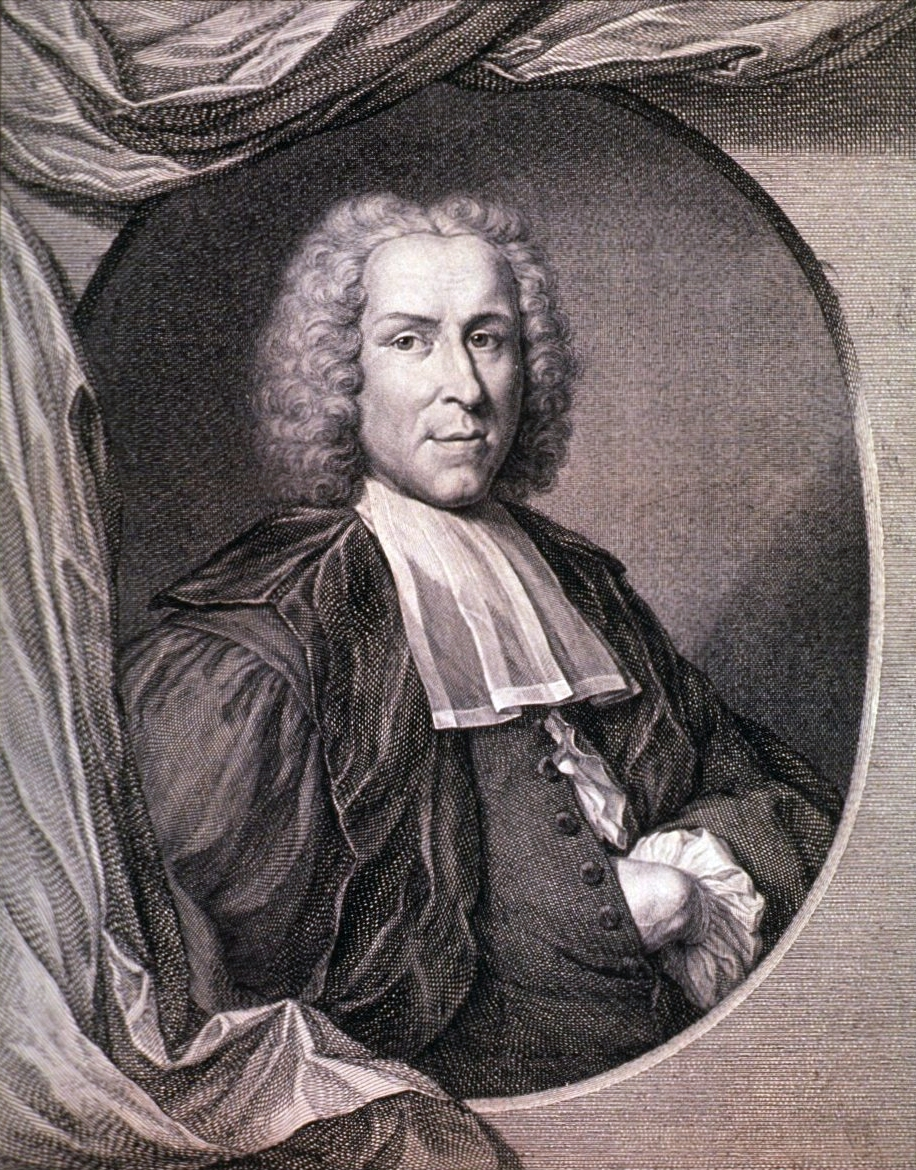
Hieronymus David Gaubius

Hieronymus David Gaubius (24 February 1705 – 29 November 1780) was a German physician and chemist.

== Life ==
He was a native of Heidelberg. He studied medicine and sciences at the Universities of Harderwijk and Leiden, where he was a pupil of Hermann Boerhaave (1668–1738) and Bernhard Siegfried Albinus (1697–1770). He earned his degree at Leiden in 1725 with a thesis on psychosomatic medicine called Dissertatio, qua idea generalis solidarum humani corporis partiur exhibitur. After graduation he continued his training in Paris, and then practiced medicine in Amsterdam and Deventer.

In 1731 Gaubius was invited to Leiden by Boerhaave as a lecturer in chemistry, and in 1734 he became a full professor of medicine and chemistry. Gaubius isolated menthol in 1771.

He was elected a Fellow of the Royal Society in 1764.

== Works ==
One of his best known works was Institutiones Pathologiae medicinalis, a 1758 textbook on systematic pathology that remained popular for many years.
