= Aelius Everhardus Vorstius =

Dutch physician, botanist and university professor

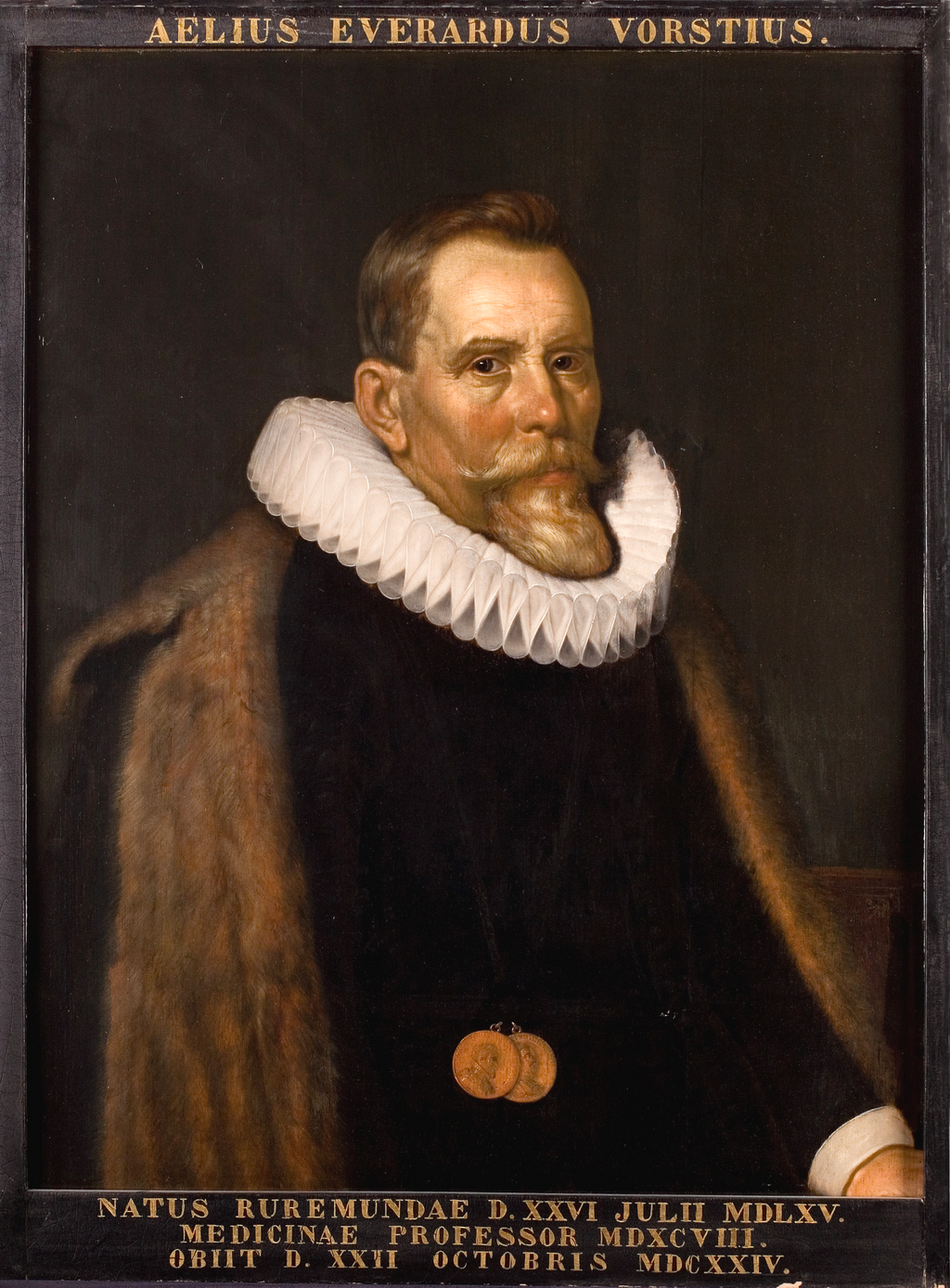
- Portrait of Aelius Everhardus Vorstius by Joris van Schooten
- Born: 26 September 1565; Roermond
- Died: 22 October 1624 (aged 59); Leiden
- Education: University of Leiden
- Scientific career
- Fields: Botany, Anatomy
- Workplaces: University of Leiden

Aelius Everhardus Vorstius (26 September 1565 – 22 October 1624) was a Dutch physician, botanist, and university professor at Leiden University from 1598 to 1624.

Born in Roermond and studied and traveled to Dordrecht, Leiden, Heidelberg, Cologne, Padua, Bologna, Ferrara, and Naples before returning to work in Delft, then Leiden where he became Director of the botanical garden. His son, Adolphus Vorst (or Vorstius) was also a prominent physician who also became professor of medicine at Leiden. He died in Leiden.
