= Abraham Heidanus =

Dutch Calvinist minister and controversialist

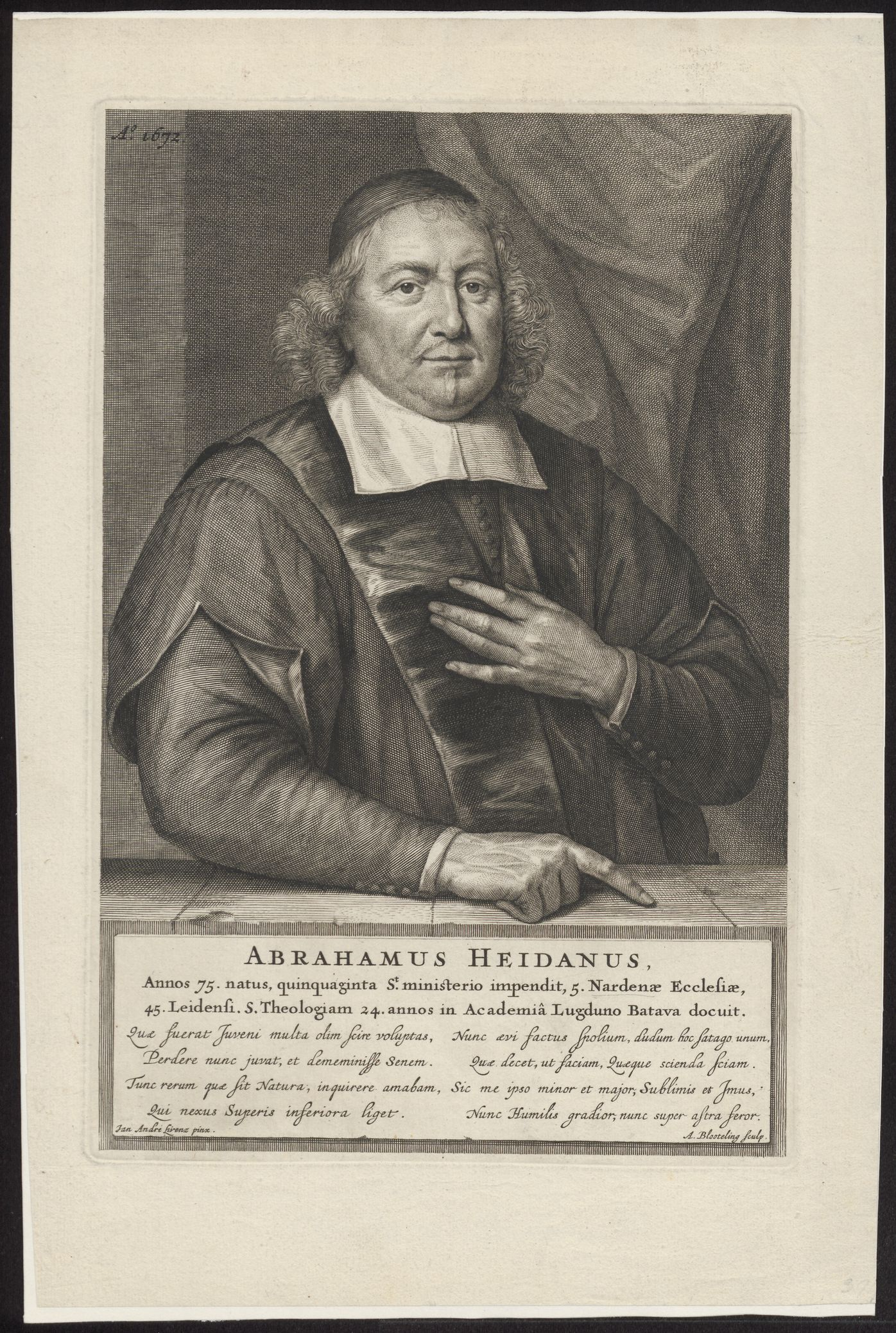
Abraham Heidanus, 1672 engraving by Abraham Blooteling, after Jan André Lievens.

Abraham van Heyden or van Heiden (Latin: Abraham Heidanus or Heydanus; 10 August 1597 – 15 October 1678) was a Dutch Calvinist minister and controversialist, sympathetic to Cartesianism.

== Life ==
He was born in Frankenthal in the Palatinate, son of Gaspar van der Heiden the Younger, a Reformed minister and Counter-Remonstrant, and his wife Clara van den Borne. The family moved to Amsterdam in 1608. Abraham studied theology at the University of Leiden from 1617, travelled to Heidelberg, Geneva and Paris, and was influenced by Ramism and Jean Daillé. He returned to an appointment as minister in Naarden in 1623, moving to Leiden in 1627.

In 1648 Heidanus was appointed professor of theology at the University of Leiden. In 1650 he invited Johannes Cocceius to join him on the faculty there. Battle lines were being drawn up for an extended series of controversies, in which Gisbertus Voetius of Utrecht took the other side.

In 1655 Johannes Hoornbeeck contributed to the debate between Voetians and Cocceians a sabbatarian pamphlet. Heidanus wrote De Sabbate (1658 in Latin, later in Dutch) in reply; Andreas Essenius attacked Heidanus, and Cocceius became drawn in, to what became a long controversy. Heidanus believed that theology and philosophy should be kept separate, and that a person did not have to have a definite opinion on philosophy in order to be a Christian.

The position Heidanus held for decades as leader of Leiden Cartesianism eventually led to his dismissal by the university in 1676. This happened after he, with Burchard de Volder and Christophorus Wittichius, published a rebuttal of the university's condemnation of Cartesian and Cocceian views.

== Family ==
On 18 May 1627, Heydanus married Sara Loten (died 15 Aug. 1669); they had nine children, four of whom survived into adulthood. His daughter Maria married the son of Johannes Crucius.
