= Petrus Cunaeus =

Dutch Christian scholar

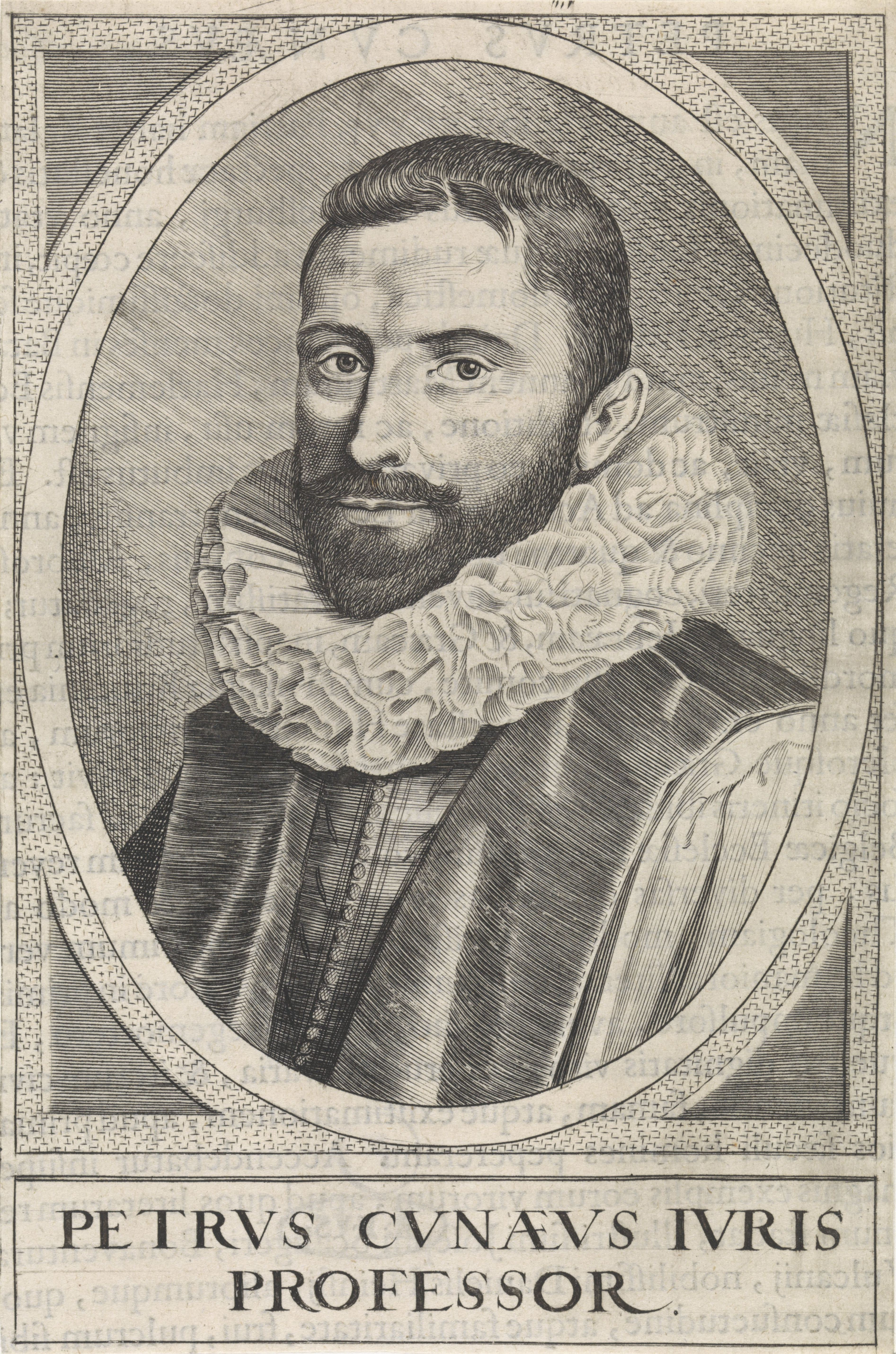
Petrus Cunaeus.

Petrus Cunaeus (1586, in Vlissingen – 2 December 1638, in Leiden) was the pen name of the Dutch Christian scholar Peter van der Kun. His book The Hebrew Republic is considered "the most powerful statement of republican theory in the early years of the Dutch Republic."

== Biography ==
Cunaeus enrolled at the University of Leyden at the age of fourteen, where he studied Greek and Hebrew. Following a trip to England in 1603, he returned to Leyden to study theology and jurisprudence. He was introduced to rabbinic studies and Aramaic by Johannes Drusius. In 1612, Cunaeus became a professor of Latin, in 1613 of politics, and in 1615 of jurisprudence, a position he held until his death.

Cunaeus wrote at the peak of Protestant interest in Jewish texts for their political as well as religious authority. He was among the leading Christian scholars of Jewish texts of a generation that included the Frenchman Joseph Scaliger, Hugo Grotius, and Bonaventure Vulcanius in the Netherlands, Johannes Buxtorf, father and son in Germany and; England, John Selden and Daniel Heinsius in England. Cunaeus also corresponded with such contemporary Jewish scholars as Menasseh ben Israel.

== The Hebrew Republic ==
Cunaeus is best remembered for his book De Republica Hebraeorum (also known as Respublica Hebraeorum and The Hebrew Republic) in which he described the ancient Hebrew kingdom as a model of republican government. The work was highly acclaimed and published in at least seven editions between 1617 and 1700. It was translated into Dutch, French and English. There had already been dozen books and essays by other authors with the same title. “ Cunaeus’ effort stood apart, for the first time presenting the Israelite state of the First Temple period, and especially the united monarchy under Saul, David, and Solomon, as a practical model for the newly independent United Provinces.”

For Cunaeus the Bible was a legal and juridical model for the functioning of an independent state. For Cunaeus, who was the leading expert of his era on Josephus, Josephus' Jewish Antiquities and Contra Apion, as well as Maimonides' Mishneh Torah, the Talmud, and the Bible together provided information demonstrating that Hebrew State was of a higher order than the Greek or Roman states. “Because its god was the true God… the Hebrew state could function as an archetype for the ideal republic. Its laws corresponded to natural law, and its social spirit flowed directly from the divine imperative of justice. This state was neither a monarchy nor an oligarchy nor a democracy, but a republic, whose senate—the Sanhedrin—and magistrates, including judges and priests, enforced and executed divinely ordained laws in ordinary civic situations. “

Cunaeus's understanding of the Hebrew State as a federal republic directly influenced the formation of the government of the Dutch Republic. It was not, however, a republic of the common man that Cunaeus wished for the Dutch, but a republic modeled on an imagined ancient Hebrew republic in which the Sanhedrin was composed of "men, not chosen from among the Plebeians, but all most noble, commended by their honourable parentage, and the ancient ornaments of their family." The Hebrew kings, were constitutional monarchs, beholden to the legislature, with the special power of holding power over the religious affairs of the nation.

Cunaeus was concerned that the Dutch Republic might fall as Athens and Rome had fallen, as a result of high living and selfish bickering among the leadership. As a model for his nation that would prevent such a calamity, he described a Hebrew republic in which "the counsels of all provided for the safety of all; and the Cities, which were many, did not every one aim at its own dominion, but all used their best endeavors to defend the public Liberty."

The Hebrew Republic, as Cunaeus saw it, was a virtuous community of republican small-hold farmers, kept that way by the Biblical law that every fiftieth (Jubilee) year all land transactions become null with the property returning to the family of the original owner. In this way, "all were equally provided for; which is the prime care of good Governours in every common-wealth," a system that insures that "the wealth of some might not lead to the oppression of the rest; nor the people change their course, and turn their minds form their innocent labors to any new and strange employment." For Cunaeus, manufacturing and commerce led to moral corruption of all kinds, the collapse of virtuous republican government among them. Virtue was equated with material simplicity, small-hold farmers, and an egalitarian distribution of wealth.

Cunaeus closed the book with an appeal for tolerance and sympathy towards contemporary Jews.
