= Burchard de Volder =

Dutch physicist (1643–1709)

- Born: 26 July 1643; Amsterdam, Dutch Republic
- Died: 21 March 1709 (aged 65); Leiden, Dutch Republic
- Education: University of Utrecht (M.A., 1660); University of Leiden (M.D., 1664)
- Scientific career
- Fields: Physics
- Institutions: University of Leiden
- Theses: De Simplicitate Dei, Echo et Republica (1660); De Natura (1664)
- Doctoral advisor: Franciscus Sylvius
- Other academic advisors: Johannes de Bruin
- Notable students: Herman Boerhaave

Burchard de Volder (26 July 1643 – 21 March 1709) was a Dutch physicist.

== Biography ==
He was born in a Mennonite family in Amsterdam. He earned an M.A. in philosophy at the University of Utrecht under Johannes de Bruin in 1660. He earned his medical doctorate from the University of Leiden under Franciscus Sylvius in 1664. He became professor of physics at Leiden University in 1670. Thanks to the efforts of the Volder, a physics laboratory at the University of Leiden was established in 1675. He collected measuring instruments of all kinds and performed many physics demonstrations, particularly those illustrating the discoveries of Robert Boyle. This laboratory was unique for its time. He is further famous as one of Gottfried Leibniz's most important philosophical correspondents.

De Volder's work drew many foreign students. One of his most famous students was Herman Boerhaave.
