= List of Leiden University people =

This is a list of people associated to Leiden University, including alumni as well as people who have taught or studied at Leiden University.

== A ==
- Piet Aalberse, Dutch politician
- Fatihya Abdi, Dutch politician
- Nasr Hamid Abu Zayd, Egyptian theologian
- John Quincy Adams, 6th President of the United States
- Princess Aimée of Orange-Nassau, van Vollenhoven-Söhngen, member of the Dutch royal family
- Nadine Akkerman, Dutch historian
- Nebahat Albayrak, Turkish–Dutch politician
- Johannes Alberti, Dutch theologian
- Bernhard Siegfried Albinus, German-born Dutch anatomist
- Alexander, Prince of Orange, heir apparent to the Dutch throne 1879–1884
- Evert Alkema, Dutch legal scholar
- Josette Altmann Borbón, First Lady of Costa Rica 1994–1998
- Tinde van Andel, Dutch ethnobotanist
- Rudy Andeweg, Dutch political scientist
- Princess Anita of Orange-Nassau, van Vollenhoven-van Eijk, member of the Dutch royal family
- Hans Ankum, Dutch legal scholar
- Sophia Antoniadis, Greek Byzantinist and first female professor at Leiden
- János Apáczai Csere, Hungarian mathematician
- Jacobus Arminius, Dutch theologian
- Tobias Asser, Dutch legal scholar and Nobel laureate (Peace 1911)
- Jimly Asshiddiqie, 1st Chief Justice of the Constitutional Court of Indonesia 2003–2008
- Touraj Atabaki, Iranian academic
- Alexander Boswell, Lord Auchinleck, Scottish judge
- Adrienne d'Aulnis de Bourouill, Dutch health lawyer

== B ==
- Pieter Baas, Dutch botanist
- Lourens Baas Becking, Dutch botanist
- Jan Bank, Dutch historian
- Caspar Barlaeus, Flemish polymath and theologian
- Johann Bartsch, German physician
- Robbert Baruch, Dutch lobbyist
- Herman Bavinck, Dutch Calvinist philosopher and theologian
- Beatrix, Queen of the Netherlands 1980–2013
- Charles Ruijs de Beerenbrouck, Netherlands Prime Minister 1918–1925, 1929–1933
- Nicolaas Beets, Dutch theologian
- Johann Peter Berg, German Protestant theologian, historian, and Orientalist
- Helma van den Berg, Dutch linguist
- Jan Hendrik van den Berg, Dutch psychiatrist
- Alexander Johan Berman, Dutch theologian and literary critic
- Joost Berman, Dutch lawyer, judge and poet
- Angel Bermudez, Aruban politician
- Petrus Bertius, Flemish philosopher
- Gerrit Berveling, Dutch Esperanto author and philologist
- Manjul Bhargava, Canadian-American mathematician
- Kune Biezeveld, Dutch theologian
- Maarten Biesheuvel, Dutch writer
- Hester Bijl, Dutch mathematician and rector magnificus of Delft University of Technology
- C. Jouco Bleeker, Dutch scholar of religion
- Nicolaas Bloembergen, Dutch–American physicist and Nobel laureate (Physics 1981)
- Thomas Blondeau, Flemish writer
- Leonard Blussé, Dutch historian
- Antoine Bodar, Dutch Roman Catholic priest
- Boediono, 11th Vice President of Indonesia 2009–2014
- Gerrit Jacob Boekenoogen, Dutch philologist
- Herman Boerhaave, Dutch chemist, botanist, Christian humanist, and physician
- Bart Bok, Dutch-American astronomer
- Frits Bolkestein, Netherlands Deputy Prime Minister 2005–2006
- Gerardus Johannes Petrus Josephus Bolland, Dutch autodidact and philosopher
- Eduard Bomhoff, Dutch economist and politician
- Jannie Borst, Dutch cancer immunologist
- Pieter Philip van Bosse, Dutch liberal politician
- Ben Bot, Dutch politician
- Douwe Breimer, Dutch pharmacologist
- Rolf Bremmer, Dutch academic
- Alex Brenninkmeijer, Dutch lawyer
- Laurens Jan Brinkhorst, Dutch politician
- Ankie Broekers-Knol, Dutch politician
- Sir Thomas Browne, English polymath and writer
- Sebald Justinus Brugmans, Dutch botanist and physician
- Hans de Bruijn, Dutch political scientist
- Philippe Buc, French-American historian
- Boudewijn Büch, Dutch writer, poet and television presenter
- Frans van Buchem, Dutch physician
- Adriaan de Buck, Dutch Egyptologist
- Franco Burgersdijk, Dutch logician
- Pieter Burman the Elder, Dutch classical scholar
- Ian Buruma, Dutch writer
- Ditmir Bushati, Albanian politician
- Kofi Abrefa Busia, Prime Minister of Ghana 1969–1972
- John Stuart, 3rd Earl of Bute, British statesman and Prime Minister of Great Britain 1762–1763
- Armin van Buuren, Dutch DJ, musician and record producer
- Paulus Buys, Dutch statesman and Land's Advocate of Holland 1572–1584

== C ==
- Archibald Cameron of Locheil, Scottish Jacobite physician
- Jacobus Capitein, African-born Dutch Reformed minister and missionary
- Hendrik Casimir, Dutch physicist
- Ludolph van Ceulen, German-Dutch mathematician
- Bart Chabot, Dutch writer and poet
- Lisa Cheng, Chinese-American linguist
- Rudolph Cleveringa, Dutch law dean known for his protest speech against the dismissal of Jewish staff in WW2
- Paul Cliteur, Dutch politician, philosopher and writer
- Carolus Clusius, French botanist
- Carel Gabriel Cobet, Dutch classical scholar
- Johannes Cocceius, German-Dutch theologian
- Jacques Cohen, Dutch embryologist
- Job Cohen, Dutch politician
- Prince Constantijn of the Netherlands, member of the Dutch Royal House
- Pieter Cort van der Linden, Prime Minister of the Netherlands 1913–1918
- Herman Coster, Dutch lawyer and State Attorney of the South African Republic 1895–1898
- Pieter de la Court, Dutch economist
- Jodocus Crull, German miscellaneous writer
- Petrus Cunaeus, Dutch Christian scholar
- Janus Henricus Donker Curtius, Dutch diplomat and last Opperhoofd of the Dutch trading post in Japan (1852–1855)

== D ==
- Johan Andreas Dèr Mouw, Dutch poet and philosopher
- René Descartes, French philosopher and mathematician
- Nicolaas Diederichs, 3rd President of South Africa 1975–1978
- René Diekstra, Dutch psychologist
- Kanta Dihal, Dutch research scientist and author
- Edsger W. Dijkstra, Dutch computer scientist
- Ewine van Dishoeck, Dutch astronomer and chemist
- Volkert Doeksen, Dutch private equity investor and the co-founder of AlpInvest Partners
- Ana Dolidze, Georgian lawyer
- Adriaen van der Donck, Dutch lawyer and landowner
- Janus Dousa, Dutch statesman
- Reinhart Dozy, French-Dutch scholar
- Huib Drion, Dutch Supreme Court judge
- Otto Duintjer, Dutch philosopher
- Thomas von der Dunk, Dutch cultural historian
- Heleen Dupuis, Dutch ethicist and politician
- J. J. L. Duyvendak, Dutch Sinologist

== E ==
- Paul Ehrenfest, Austrian theoretical physicist
- Willem Einthoven, Dutch physiologist and Nobel laureate (Medicine 1924)
- Albert Einstein, German-born theoretical physicist and Nobel laureate (Physics 1921)
- Rudi Ekkart, Dutch art historian
- Arjan El Fassed, Dutch politician and human rights activist
- Afshin Ellian, Iranian-born Dutch legal scholar and philosopher
- Henny Eman, Aruban politician
- Willem Anthony Engelbrecht, Dutch jurist and colonial administrator
- Simon Episcopius, Dutch theologian
- Paul Sophus Epstein, Russian-American mathematical physicist
- Thomas van Erpe, Dutch Orientalist
- Pieter Nicolaas van Eyck, Dutch poet and critic

== F ==
- Kathleen Ferrier, Surinam-born Dutch politician
- Enrico Fermi, Italian-American physicist and Nobel laureate (Physics 1938)
- Henry Fielding, English writer and judge
- Horst Fischer, German lawyer
- Paul Fleming, German physician and poet
- Prince Frederick of the Netherlands, member of the Dutch Royal House
- Prince Floris of Orange-Nassau, van Vollenhoven, member of the Dutch royal family
- Dirk Fock, Dutch politician and diplomat
- Jan P. Fokkelman, Dutch biblical scholar
- Justin Fox (born 1964), American financial journalist, commentator, and writer
- John Lauder, Lord Fountainhall, Scottish jurist
- Johannes le Francq van Berkhey, Dutch naturalist, poet and painter
- Prince Frederick of the Netherlands, member of the Dutch Royal House
- Frederick William, Elector of Brandenburg, ruler of Brandenburg-Prussia 1640–1688

== G ==
- Jacob Geel, Dutch scholar, critic and librarian
- Ida Gerhardt, Dutch classicist and poet
- Richard D. Gill, British-Dutch mathematician
- Thomas Girdlestone, English physician and writer
- Michiel Jan de Goeje, Dutch orientalist
- Jacobus Golius, Dutch orientalist and mathematician
- Franciscus Gomarus, Dutch theologian
- Cornelis Jacobus Gorter, Dutch experimental and theoretical physicist
- Samuel Goudsmit, Dutch-American physicist
- Andries Cornelis Dirk de Graeff, diplomat, statesman, governor-general of the Dutch East Indies 1926–1931, and a Dutch minister for foreign affairs 1933–1937
- Gerrit de Graeff (I.) van Zuid-Polsbroek, politician, Chairman of the Dutch East Indies Company and the Dutch West Indies Company 1736 / 1737–1752
- Jacob Dircksz de Graeff, Dutch regent, mayor of Amsterdam 1613–1638
- Johann Georg Graevius, German classical scholar and critic
- Willem 's Gravesande, Dutch mathematician and natural philosopher
- Christian Greco, Italian Egyptologist
- Richard T. Griffiths, English-Dutch historian
- Guillaume Groen van Prinsterer, Dutch politician and historian
- Jane Grogan, Australian-born, US-based immunologist and cancer researcher
- Jacobus Gronovius, Dutch classical scholar
- J. J. M. de Groot, Dutch sinologist and historian
- Hugo Grotius, Dutch classicist, legal scholar, writer and poet
- Robert van Gulik, Dutch orientalist, diplomat, and writer, of e.g. the Judge Dee historical mysteries
- Johannes Gysius, Dutch historian and minister

== H ==
- Geertruida de Haas-Lorentz, Dutch theoretical physicist
- Anton de Haen, Dutch physician
- Gijs van Hall, Dutch banker and resistance fighter
- Hendrik Jacob Hamaker, Dutch jurist and scholar
- Sri Sultan Hamengkubuwono IX, 9th Sultan of Yogyakarta 1940–1988, and 2nd Vice-President of Indonesia 1973–1978
- Bas Haring, Dutch writer of popular science
- Maarten 't Hart, Dutch writer
- David Hartley the Younger, English politician and inventor
- Mohammad Hatta, Indonesian statesman and 1st Vice President of Indonesia
- François Haverschmidt, Dutch minister and writer under the pen name of "Piet Paaltjens"
- Erik Hazelhoff Roelfzema, Dutch writer, resistance fighter, RAF pilot
- Paul F. van der Heijden, Dutch jurist and labour‑law scholar
- Daniel Heinsius, scholar of the Dutch Renaissance
- Pieter Hellendaal, Dutch composer, organist and violinist
- Tiberius Hemsterhuis, Dutch philologist and critic
- Jaap van den Herik, Dutch computer scientist
- Paul Hermann, German-born physician and botanist
- Felienne Hermans, Dutch computer scientist
- Ejnar Hertzsprung, Danish chemist and astronomer
- Gerrit Jan van Heuven Goedhart, Dutch politician, diplomat and journalist, Nobel laureate (Peace 1954)
- Johannes Hevelius, Polish astronomer and jurist
- Nina den Heyer, Dutch politician and member of the Executive Council of Bonaire
- Rosalyn Higgins, Baroness Higgins, British judge and President of the International Court of Justice
- Ayaan Hirsi Ali, Somali-born Dutch-American writer and activist
- Nicole Hoevertsz, Aruban synchronized swimmer
- Jacobus Henricus van 't Hoff, Dutch physical chemist and Nobel laureate (Chemistry 1901)
- Gijsbert Karel, Count van Hogendorp, Dutch statesman
- Paul Thiry, Baron d'Holbach, Franco-German philosopher, writer, and prominent figure in the Enlightenment
- Rick Honings, Dutch literature scholar
- Jaap de Hoop Scheffer, Dutch politician and 11th Secretary-General of NATO
- George Howe, Scottish physician active in London; Fellow of the Royal College of Physicians
- Johannes Hudde, Dutch politician and mathematician, mayor of Amsterdam 1672–1703
- Johan Huizinga, Dutch historian and founder of modern cultural history
- Mariska Hulscher, Dutch TV presenter
- Christiaan Huygens, Dutch mathematician and physicist
- Sir Constantijn Huygens, Sr., Dutch diplomat, poet and composer
- Constantijn Huygens, Jr., Dutch statesman and poet

== I ==
- Michael Ignatieff, Canadian politician

== J ==
- Maarten Jansen, Dutch archaeologist and ancient American scholar
- Marius Jeuken, Dutch theoretical biologist
- Eva Jinek, Dutch-American journalist and television presenter
- Willem Jozef Andreas Jonckbloet, Dutch historian
- Carla de Jonge, Dutch art historian and museum director
- Ernst de Jonge, Dutch lawyer, Olympic rower, resistance fighter
- Stefanie Joosten, Dutch actress and model
- P. E. de Josselin de Jong, Dutch cultural anthropologist
- Juliana, Queen of the Netherlands 1948–1980

== K ==
- Frederik Kaiser, Dutch astronomer
- Cornelis Kalkman, Dutch botanist
- Heike Kamerlingh Onnes, Dutch experimental physicist and Nobel laureate (Physics 1913)
- Egbert van Kampen, Dutch mathematician
- Annelien Kappeyne van de Coppello, Dutch politician
- Jan Kappeyne van de Coppello, Dutch politician
- Paul Joan George Kapteyn, Dutch judge, member of the Council of State of the Netherlands 1976–1990
- Gerrit Kastein, Dutch communist, neurologist and resistance fighter
- Jetty Kleijn, Dutch computer scientist
- Jacob de Kempenaer, Dutch politician
- Johan Hendrik Caspar Kern, Dutch linguist and orientalist
- Jan Keunen, Dutch ophthalmologist and politician
- Israël David Kiek, Dutch portrait photographer
- Elselijn Kingma, Dutch philosopher
- Andreas Kinneging, Dutch philosopher
- Alberto van Klaveren, Dutch-born Chilean lawyer and political scientist, Minister of Foreign Affairs of Chile 2023–2026
- Theodorus Klompe, Dutch geologist
- Victoria Koblenko, Ukrainian-born Dutch actress and presenter
- Ko Kwat Tiong, Indonesian lawyer, politician, Indonesian nationalist and civil servant
- Henk Koning, Dutch politician
- Pieter Kooijmans, Dutch politician, judge of the International Court of Justice
- Ton Koopman, Dutch conductor, organist and harpsichordist
- Sven Koopmans, Dutch international lawyer, diplomat and politician
- Tjalling Charles Koopmans, Dutch-American mathematician and economist, Nobel laureate (Economics 1975)
- Maarten Kossmann, Dutch linguist
- Hugo Krabbe, Dutch jurist and legal philosopher
- Hendrik Anthony Kramers, physicist
- Dirk Willem van Krevelen, chemical engineer and scientist
- Yvonne Kroonenberg, Dutch psychologist and author
- Abraham Kuenen, Dutch Protestant theologian
- Johannes Kuenen, Dutch physicist
- Abraham Kuijper, Dutch theologian and politician, Prime Minister of the Netherlands 1901–1905
- Aert H. Kuipers, Dutch linguist
- Erik Kwakkel, Dutch codicologist

== L ==
- Lousewies van der Laan, Dutch politician
- Herman Johannes Lam, Dutch botanist
- Stefan Landsberger, Dutch sinologist
- Richard Lauwaars, Dutch legal scholar
- Jona Lendering, Dutch historian
- Hendrik Lenstra, Dutch mathematician
- Jan Hendrik Leopold, Dutch poet and classicist
- Willem Levelt, Dutch psycholinguist
- Frans de Liagre Böhl, Dutch Assyriologist
- Arend Lijphart, Dutch-American political scientist
- Justus Lipsius, Flemish philologist, philosopher, and humanist
- J. H. A. Lokin, Dutch legal scholar
- Hendrik Antoon Lorentz, Dutch theoretical physicist and Nobel laureate (Physics 1902)

== M ==
- Cornald Maas, Dutch television presenter
- George Maduro, Curaçaoan-Dutch law student and resistance fighter
- Peter Mair, Irish political scientist
- Princess Margriet of the Netherlands, member of the Dutch Royal House
- Paul-Henri Marron, French Reformed pastor
- Rutsel Martha, Curaçaoan internist, politician, and government minister
- Frank Martinus Arion, Curaçaoan author
- Eric Mazur, Dutch-born American physicist
- Richard Mead, English physician
- Jonas Daniel Meijer, first Jewish lawyer in the Netherlands
- Eduard Meijers, Dutch jurist
- Jeroen Mettes, Dutch essayist and poet
- Luuk van Middelaar, Dutch historian and political philosopher
- Mohammad Syafaat Mintaredja, indonesian politician, 7th Ambassador of Indonesia to Turkey
- Kornelis Heiko Miskotte, Dutch Protestant theologian
- Anthony Modderman, Dutch politician
- Michiel Mol, Dutch businessman, and former director of Spyker F1 and Force India
- Philipp Christiaan Molhuysen, Dutch librarian, historian, and biographer
- Hubertus van Mook, Dutch administrator, Lieutenant Governor-General of the Dutch East Indies 1942–1948
- Victor Muller, Dutch businessman, founder of Spyker Cars
- Pieter van Musschenbroek, Dutch scientist and inventor of the Leyden jar

== N ==
- William Frederick, Prince of Nassau-Dietz, Stadtholder of Friesland (1640-1664) and of Groningen and Drenthe (1650–1664)
- Nelson Navarro, Curaçaoan jurist and politician, Minister of Justice of Curaçao 2012–2016
- Helma Neppérus, Dutch politician
- Janne Nijman, Dutch scholar of international law
- Raden Mas Noto Soeroto, a prince of the Javanese princely state Pakualaman, poet and writer of Dutch Indies literature

== O ==
- Alexander Ollongren, Dutch mathematician and astronomer
- Jan Hendrik Oort, Dutch astronomer
- Frits van Oostrom, Dutch historical literary scholar
- Ivo Opstelten, Dutch politician and jurist
- Julius Christiaan van Oven, Dutch jurist and politician
- Cornelis Ouwehand, anthropologist

== P ==
- Nathan Paget, English physician
- Peter Simon Pallas, Prussian zoologist
- Antonie Pannekoek, Dutch astronomer and political theorist
- Senarath Paranavithana, Sri Lankan archeologist and epigraphist
- Thomas Parker, English minister and scholar, founder of Newbury, Massachusetts
- Pieter Pauw, Dutch botanist and anatomist
- Alexander Pechtold, Dutch politician, Mayor of Delft since 2025
- Perizonius, Dutch classical scholar
- Christiaan Hendrik Persoon, Cape Colony mycologist and botanist
- Mariko Peters, Dutch politician
- Herman Philipse, Dutch philosopher
- Phoa Liong Gie, Indonesian-born Swiss jurist, politician and newspaper owner
- Frank N. Pieke, Dutch cultural anthropologist
- Nicolaas Gerard Pierson, Dutch Prime Minister 1897–1901
- Theodoor Gautier Thomas Pigeaud, German-born Dutch lexicographer
- Jacob Piry, Indonesian communist and politician, Member of People's Representative Council (1956–1960)
- Archibald Pitcairne, Scottish physician
- Ronald Plasterk, Dutch microbiologist and politician, Ministers of Education (2007–2010) and of the Interior of the Netherlands (2016–2017)
- Willem George Pluygers, Dutch classical scholar
- Gerrit van Poelje, Dutch civil servant, lawyer and Public Administration scholar
- Fransjohan Pretorius: historian of the Second Anglo-Boer War (1899-1902), professor University of Pretoria
- Prijono, Indonesian politician and academic

== R ==
- Hans Ras, academic
- Caspar Georg Carl Reinwardt, botanist
- Caspar Reuvens, archaeologist
- Thomas Reydon, philosopher of science
- John Robinson, Pilgrim Fathers pastor
- Wil Roebroeks, archaeologist
- Grzegorz Rozenberg, computer scientist
- Olaus Rudbeck, scientist and university rector
- Yana Rudenko, Ukrainian activist
- David Ruhnken, scholar
- Charlotte Rulkens, Dutch art historian
- Mark Rutte, Netherlands Prime Minister 2010–24

== S ==
- Ali Sastroamidjojo, Prime Minister of Indonesia
- Joseph Justus Scaliger, theologian and scholar
- Henry G. Schermers, jurist
- Edith Schippers, politician
- Sander Schimmelpenninck, opinion writer & -commentator, and television presenter
- Rutger Jan Schimmelpenninck, Grand Pensionary of Holland 1805–1806
- Frans van Schooten, Dutch mathematician
- Gerard Schouw, politician
- Marlou Schrover, professor of economic and social history
- William Sherard, botanist
- Boudewijn Sirks, academic
- Willem de Sitter, physicist
- Jan Six, politician
- Willebrord Snell, astronomer
- Rudolph Snellius, mathematician and linguist
- Christiaan Snouck Hurgronje, orientalist
- Achmad Soebardjo, diplomat
- Soenario, politician
- Noto Soeroto, poet, journalist and activist
- Soetan Sjahrir, Prime Minister of Indonesia 1945–47
- Andreas Sparman, 17th-century Swedish court physician and author
- Myles Standish, military leader
- Jan Steen, painter
- Miep Stegmann, first woman psychiatrist in Belgium
- Simon Stevin, engineer, scientist
- Martinus Theunis Steyn, lawyer, Orange Free State president
- Pieter Steyn, Grand Pensionary of Holland 1749–72
- Dirk Jan Struik, mathematician
- Franciscus Sylvius, physician and scientist
- Albert Szent-Györgyi, Nobel laureate (Medicine 1937)

== T ==
- Morris Tabaksblat, Dutch captain of industry
- Naema Tahir, British-born Pakistani-Dutch human rights lawyer and author
- Igor Tamm, Soviet physicist and Nobel laureate (Physics 1958)
- Paul-Peter Tak, Dutch immunologist
- Willem Teellinck, Dutch theologian and ascetic writer
- Benjamin Marius Telders, Dutch lawyer and politician.
- Julius Terpstra, Dutch politician
- Johan Rudolf Thorbecke, Dutch liberal statesman and Netherlands Prime Minister 1871–1872
- Cornelis Tiele, Dutch theologian and scholar of religions
- Christiaan Timmermans, Dutch jurist and judge at the European Court of Justice 2000–2010
- Jan Tinbergen, Dutch economist and Nobel laureate (Economics 1969)
- Luuk Tinbergen, Dutch ornithologist and ecologist
- Nikolaas Tinbergen, Dutch biologist, ornithologist and Nobel laureate (Medicine 1973)
- Susanto Tirtoprodjo, acting Prime Minister of Indonesia 1949–1950
- Isaac Titsingh, Dutch diplomat, historian, Japanologist, and merchant
- Herman Tjeenk Willink, Dutch politician and Vice-President of the Council of State of the Netherlands 1997–2012
- Jaana Toivari-Viitala, Finnish egyptologist
- Melchior Treub, Dutch botanist
- Franca Treur, Dutch writer and journalist
- Nicolaes Tulp, Dutch physician and mayor of Amsterdam 1654–1670

== U ==
- Christianus Cornelis Uhlenbeck, linguist and anthropologist

== V ==
- Leo van de Putte, Dutch medical scientist
- Coenraad van Beuningen, diplomat
- Ronald Venetiaan, president of Suriname
- Armin van Buuren, musician
- Ludolph van Ceulen, mathematician
- Jan Kappeyne van de Coppello, Netherlands Prime Minister 1877–79
- Marcel R.M. van den Brink, oncologist and medical researcher
- Johannes van den Driesche, theologian
- Adriaen van der Donck, lawyer
- Lousewies van der Laan, politician
- Max van der Stoel, politician
- Bram van der Stok, aviator
- Johannes Diderik van der Waals, Nobel laureate (Physics 1910)
- Aone van Engelenhoven, linguist and anthropologist
- Thomas van Erpe, orientalist
- Melanie Schultz van Haegen, politician
- Gijsbert Karel van Hogendorp, Netherlands Prime Minister 1813–14
- Egbert van Kampen, mathematician
- Pieter van Musschenbroek, scientist
- Rembrandt van Rijn, painter
- Cornelis van Vollenhoven, academic
- Pieter van Vollenhoven, royalty
- Ronald Venetiaan, Surinam President
- Maxime Verhagen, Netherlands Deputy Prime Minister
- Paul Verhoeven, film director
- Marjolijn Verspoor, linguist
- Gisbertus Voetius, theologian
- Gerhard Johann Vossius, theologian
- Gijs de Vries, politician
- Jouke de Vries, academic

== W ==
- Wilhelmina, Queen of the Netherlands 1890–1948
- John Wilkes, politician
- William the Silent, Prince of Orange and founder of the university
- Willem-Alexander, King of the Netherlands since 2013
- Djumhana Wiriaatmadja, Prime Minister of Pasundan 1949–1950
- Hendrik de Wit, botanist
- Johan de Witt, Grand Pensionary of Holland 1653–72
- Willem Witteveen, legal scholar and politician
- William III of England, King of England 1689–1702
- James Windet, 17th-century English medical doctor

== Z ==
- Pieter Zeeman, Nobel laureate (Physics 1902)
- Tim de Zeeuw, astronomer
- Gerrit-Jan Zwenne, Dutch legal scholar
- Petrus Josephus Zoetmulder, academic
- Ben Zonneveld, botanist
- Han Zuilhof, chemist
- André van Zundert, Belgian anaesthesiologist and academic

== See also ==
- List of rectores magnifici of Leiden University
