= MIEP =

Miep or MIEP may refer to:

- Hungarian Justice and Life Party (in Hungarian, Magyar Igazság és Élet Pártja), a political party
- Miep Diekmann (1925–2017), Dutch writer of children's literature
- Miep Gies (1909–2010), one of the Dutch citizens who hid Anne Frank
- Miep Stegmann (1927-1985), Belgian psychologist
