= Horst Fischer (disambiguation) =

Horst Fischer (1912–1966) was a German doctor executed for war crimes.

Horst Fischer may also refer to:

- Horst Fischer (lawyer) (born 1950), German lawyer and academic
- Horst Fischer (musician) (1930–1986), German trumpeter

== See also ==
- Horst Fascher (born 1936), German music manager and associate of the Beatles
