= Stegman =

Stegman is a surname. Notable people with the surname include:

- David William Stegman (born 1954), outfielder for the Detroit Tigers
- Lewis R. Stegman, Colonel in the US Civil War
- Maritta Martin Wolff Stegman (1918–2002), American author
- Ryan Stegman (born 1981), American comic book artist
- Trevor Robert Stegman (born 1946), rugby union player

== See also ==
- Stegmann
