= Stolker =

Stolker is a surname. It may refer to:

- Carel Stolker (born 1954), Dutch university administrator and professor
- Jan Stolker (1724–1785), Dutch printmaker, painter, painting dealer, and art collector
- Michel Stolker (1933–2018), Dutch racing cyclist

== See also ==
- Stolkertsijver, a town in the Commewijne District of Suriname
