= Marlou Schrover =

Dutch historian

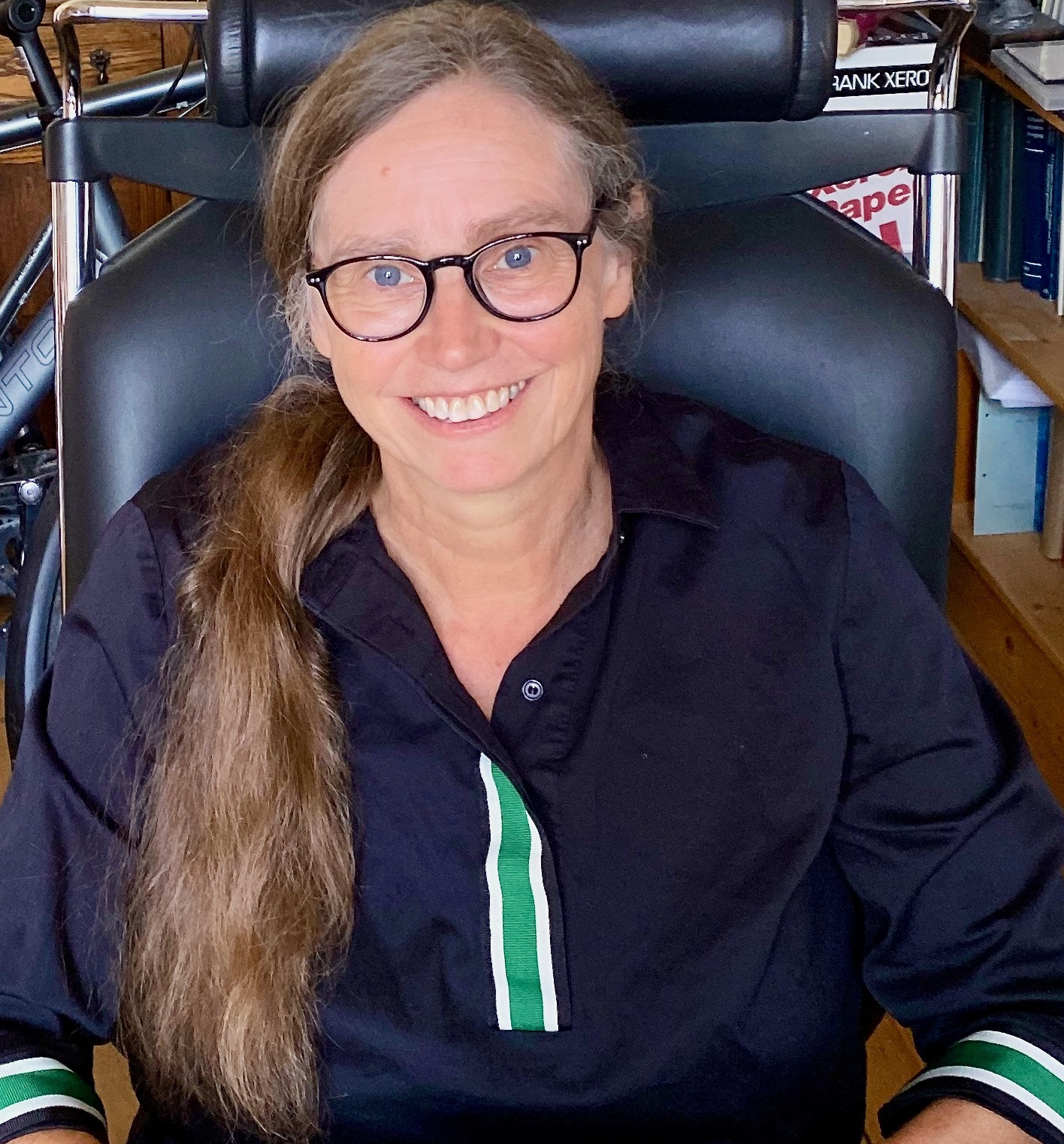
- Marlou Schrover
- Born: 4 March 1959; Den Bosch, Netherlands
- Occupations: Historian, professor
- Employer: Leiden University
- Known for: Research on migration history, gender, and ethnicity
- Title: Professor of Migration History
- Website: www.universiteitleiden.nl/en/staffmembers/marlou-schrover

Marlou Schrover (born 4 March 1959) is a Dutch historian and professor of economic and social history, specialised in migration history at Leiden University. She also is an LDE professor at the Erasmus University Rotterdam. She examines the history of migration, gender, ethnicity, class, religion, and sexuality in the Netherlands and Europe, with a focus on the nineteenth and twentieth centuries.

== Early life and education ==
Schrover grew up in Den Bosch. After she finished her high school she studied journalism and graduated when she was twenty years old. Because she was female in a highly dominated male field Schrover decided to study history "to stand more firmly in the journalistic field". She studied social and Economic History at University Utrecht, where she also defended her PhD thesis (1991).

== Academic career ==
Since 2003 she worked at University of Leiden. She has led research projects funded by the Netherlands Organisation for Scientific Research (NWO), including studies on migration patterns and integration policies in the Netherlands. Her work integrates perspectives from migration studies, gender history, and social history, exploring how historical processes shape modern migration debates.

After arriving in Leiden, she founded a women's network for female academics at the university and named it after Sophia Antoniadis, the very first female professor at Leiden. The network's goal was to "make women visible at the university and remove barriers for women without making it a women's issue." Schrover also served on the editorial board of the Jaarboek voor vrouwengeschiedenis for many years.

In her research, Schrover placed gender at the center of historical analysis of migration history and advocated an intersectionalist approach. She showed that gender cannot be understood in isolation but must be analyzed in relation to other forms of inequality such as class, ethnicity, sexuality, and legal status. With this she demonstrated that migration processes are structured by overlapping and mutually constitutive power relations, which shape opportunities, trajectories, and outcomes in historically specific ways.

Schrover was editor in chief of TSEG: The Low Countries Journal of Social and Economic History and currently is the editor in Chief of the Journal of Migration History. She has contributed to public discussions on migration and integration. She is the author or editor of several books.

== Selected publications ==
- Marlou Schrover & Deirdre Moloney (eds), Gender, Migration and Categorisation: Making Distinctions between Migrants in Western Countries, 1945–2010. Amsterdam University Press, 2013. ISBN 978-9089645739
- Marlou Schrover & Willem Schinkel (eds), The Language of Inclusion and Exclusion in Immigration and Integration (New York Routledge 2014).
- Herman Obdeijn & Marlou Schrover, Komen en gaan. Immigratie en emigratie in Nederland vanaf 1550 (Amsterdam Bert Bakker 2008).
- Marlou Schrover, Een kolonie van Duitsers. Groepsvorming onder Duitse immigranten in Utrecht in de negentiende eeuw (Amsterdam Aksant 2002).
