= Kanta Dihal =

Senior research fellow at the University of Cambridge

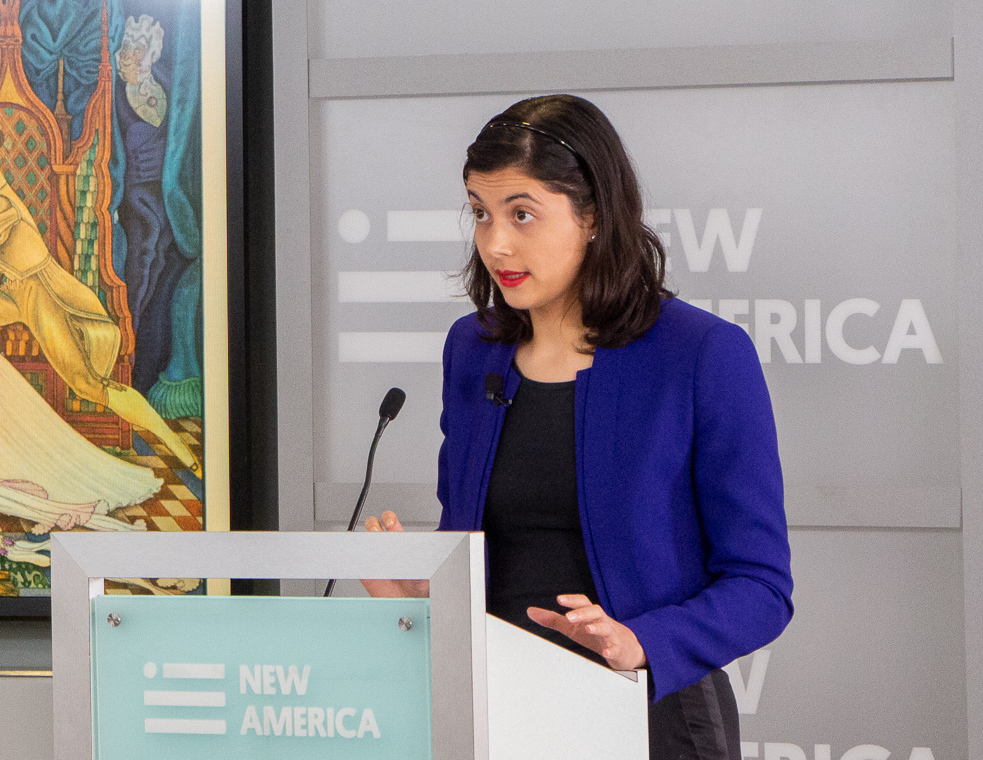
- Dihal speaking at a conference in 2019
- Born: Eindhoven, The Netherlands
- Education: Leiden University (B.A., B.A., M.A.); University of Oxford (Ph.D.)
- Known for: Artificial intelligence in fiction Science communication Artificial intelligence and AI ethics
- Scientific career
- Fields: Science communication
- Workplaces: Science Communication Unit, Imperial College London
- Thesis: The stories of quantum physics (2018)
- Doctoral advisor: Sally Shuttleworth; Michael Whitworth
- Website: https://kantadihal.com/

Kanta Dihal is a Dutch research scientist who works at the intersection of artificial intelligence, science communication, literature, and ethics. She is currently a lecturer in science communication at Imperial College London. Dihal is co-editor of the books AI Narratives: A History of Imaginative Thinking About Intelligent Machines and Imagining AI: How the World Sees Intelligent Machines.

== Education ==
Dihal received a Bachelor of Arts in English and Language Culture in 2011, a Bachelor of Arts in Film and Literary Studies in 2012, and a Masters of Arts in Literary Studies in 2014 from Leiden University. She completed her Ph.D. in Science Communication from the University of Oxford in 2018. Her thesis, advised by Sally Shuttleworth and Michael Whitworth, explored the communication of conflicting interpretations of quantum physics to adults and children.

== Career and research ==
Dihal's research intersects the fields of AI ethics, science communication, literature and science, and science fiction.

She is currently a lecturer in science communication at Imperial College London. Prior to this, she worked as a senior research fellow at the Leverhulme Centre for the Future of Intelligence at the University of Cambridge. She led two research projects there: Global AI Narratives and Decolonizing AI. The Global AI Narratives project explores the public understanding of AI as constructed by fictional and nonfictional narratives, spanning ancient classics like the Iliad all the way to modern films like Steven Spielberg's AI. With her colleagues, she is attempting to document the ways in which AI is understood and developed around the world and their consequences on diversity and equality. In her work for the Decolonizing AI project, Dihal examines how AI is portrayed in media, stock images, and dialect often with more "white" depictions and warns of the risk of creating a "homogeneous" workforce of technologists where people of colour are erased.

=== AI Narratives: A History of Imaginative Thinking About Intelligent Machines ===
Dihal is co-editor of the book AI Narratives: A History of Imaginative Thinking About Intelligent Machines, alongside Stephen Cave and Sarah Dillon. The book is a collection of essays examining how narrative representations of AI have shaped technological development, understanding of humans, and the social and political orders that emerge from their relationships. The Times Literary Supplement remarked that this book is a “compelling collection shows how AI narratives have prompted critical reflection on human-machine relations”.

=== Selected awards ===
- 2020 Most Influential Women in UK Technology Award Nominee
- 2021 100 Brilliant Women in AI Ethics Hall of Fame Honoree
