= Stegmann =

Stegmann is a German surname. Notable people with the surname include:

- Boris K. Stegmann (1898–1975), Russian ornithologist
- Carl David Stegmann (1751–1826), German tenor
- Matthias von Stegmann (born 1968), German voice-over artist and operatic stage director
- Miep Stegmann (1927-1985), Belgian psychologist
- Niklas Stegmann (born 1987), German footballer
- Povl Stegmann (1888–1944), Danish architect
- Seb Stegmann (born 1989), English rugby player
- Wilhelm Stegmann (1899-1944), German politician
- Leonard Stegmann (born 1953), American humor writer
