= Rick Honings =

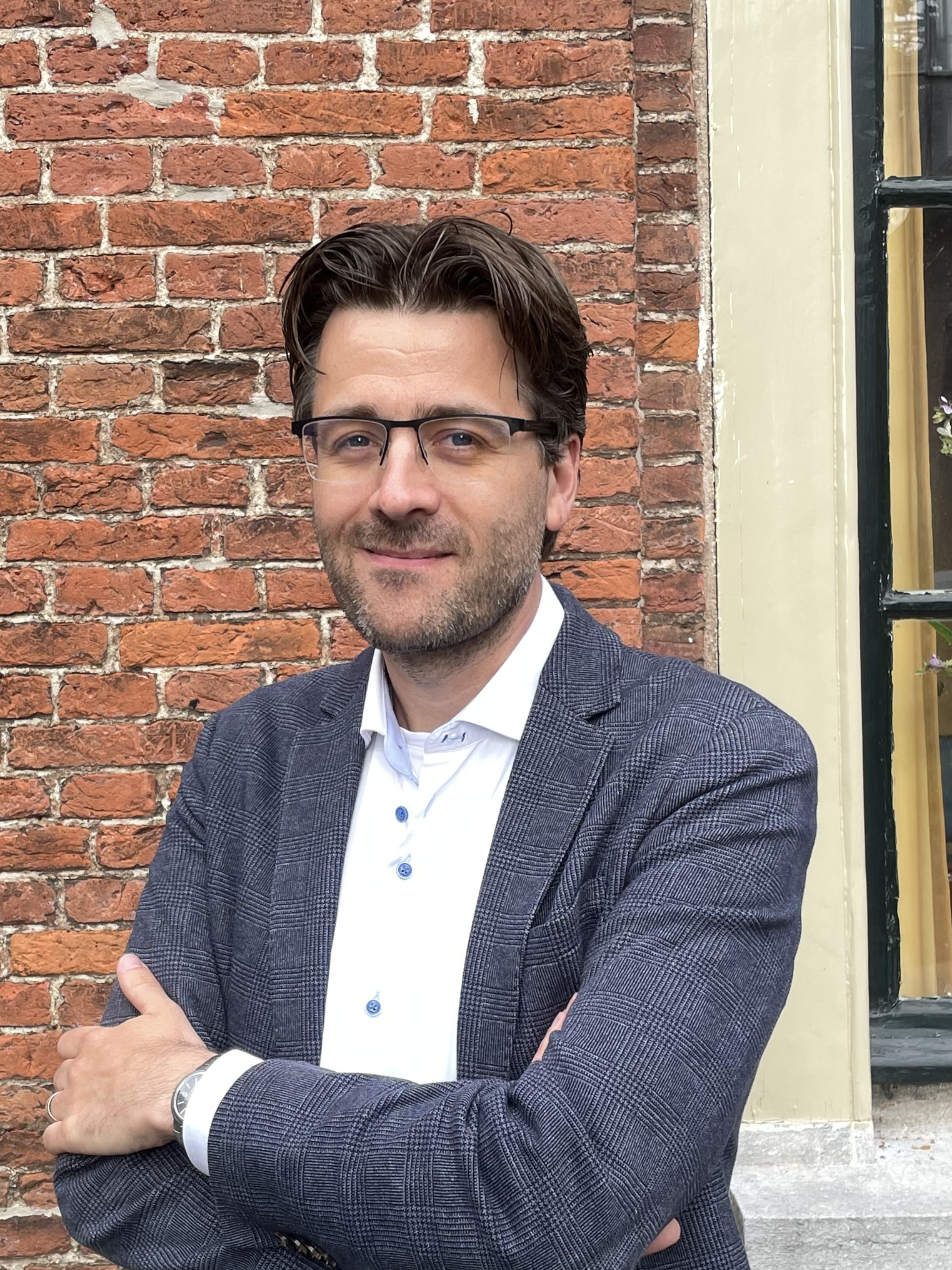
- Honings (2026)
- Born: 27 April 1984 (age 42); Heerlen
- Education: Leiden University
- Scientific career
- Workplaces: Leiden University

Rick Honings (Heerlen, 1984) is a Dutch literature scholar at the Leiden University Centre for the Arts in Society (LUCAS), who specializes in nineteenth-century Dutch and Dutch Indies literature. As of 2020 he is Scaliger professor as an ambassador for the Special Collections at Leiden University Libraries. Honings is editor-in-chief of the journal Indische Letteren. Tijdschrift van de Werkgroep Indisch-Nederlandse Letterkunde.

== Quote ==
We have seen that in the Netherlands a peculiar link existed between Calvinism and celebrity, especially clear in the cases of Bilderdijk and Da Costa. This phenomenon was characteristic of the Netherlands where Protestantism was all-encompassing. Both Bilderdijk and Da Costa were not only well-known poets, but also became famous (or infamous) as orthodox-Calvinist mentors. Nicolaas Beets and François HaverSchmidt became famous authors during their student years. This too is a phenomenon characteristic of the Dutch situation. Being students these authors had the freedom to experiment within the literary context. Finally, authors were strongly influenced by literary examples from abroad. Beets and HaverSchmidt did not shy away from modelling their images as lookalikes of international authors like Byron or Heine.

— Rick Honings, Star Authors in the Age of Romanticism : Literary Celebrity in the Netherlands, Amsterdam University Press, 2018, pp. 224-225.

== Publications ==
Honing's publications include:

=== in English ===
- Honings, Rick (2017). "Travelling through the Emerald Belt: A Plea for a Post-Colonial Double Perspective". In Reeuwijk, Alexander (ed.). Voyage of discovery. Exploring the collections of the Asian library of Leiden University. Leiden: Leiden University Press. pp. 166–177. ISBN 9789087282745. OCLC 990548766. 335 pages.
- Honings, Rick (2018). Star Authors in the Age of Romanticism: Literary Celebrity in the Netherlands explores the rise of literary celebrity in the 19th century. Leiden: Leiden University Press. ISBN 9789087283087. OCLC 1038006946. 275 pages. Online access through the Leiden University library catalogue.
- Honings, Rick; Op de Beek, Esther, eds. (2023). Animals in Dutch Travel Writing, 1800‑present. Leiden: Leiden University Press. ISBN 9789087284022. OCLC 1355602155. 295 pages. Downloadable PDF.
- Jedamski, Doris; Honings, Rick, eds. (2023). Travelling the Dutch East Indies. Historical Perspectives and Literary Representations. Hilversum: Verloren. ISBN 9789464550450. OCLC 1370641869. 229 pages.

=== in Dutch ===
- Honings, Rick (2011). Geleerdheids zetel, Hollands roem! : het literaire leven in Leiden 1760-1860 [Seat of learning, Dutch glory! : literary life in Leiden 1760-1860] (in Dutch). Leiden: Primavera Pers. ISBN 9789059971141. OCLC 1024185891. PhD thesis Leiden, 497 pages.
- Honings, Rick; van Zonneveld, Peter (2013). De gefnuikte arend. Het leven van Willem Bilderdijk [The Crippled Eagle. The Life of Willem Bilderdijk] (in Dutch). Amsterdam: Prometheus, Bert Bakker. ISBN 9789035138094. OCLC 862445484. 652 pages.
- Honings, Rick (2016). De dichter als idool. Literaire roem in de negentiende eeuw [The Poet as Idol. Literary Fame in the Nineteenth Century] (in Dutch). Amsterdam: Bert Bakker. ISBN 9789035144316. OCLC 937416602. 511 pages.
- Honings, Rick; van 't Veer, Coen; Bel, Jacqueline, eds. (2021). De postkoloniale spiegel. De Nederlands-Indische letteren herlezen [The Postcolonial Mirror. Rereading Dutch-Indonesian Literature] (in Dutch). Leiden: Leiden University Press. ISBN 9789087283735. OCLC 1259044962. 536 pages.
- Honings, Rick (2023). De ontdekking van Insulinde. Op reis in Nederlands-Indië in de negentiende eeuw [The Discovery of Insulinde. Traveling in the Dutch East Indies in the nineteenth century] (in Dutch). Amsterdam: Prometheus. ISBN 9789044645408. OCLC 1395131743. 555 pages.
- Honings, Rick; Jensen, Lotte (2019). Romantici en revolutionairen. Literatuur en schrijverschap in Nederland in de 18de en 19de eeuw. Amsterdam: Prometheus. ISBN 9789044630770. OCLC 1112596383. 407 pages.

== Awards ==
- Erik Hazelhoff Biografieprijs 2014 (biography award), from the Stichting Erik Hazelhoff Roelfzema Prijs foundation, shared with co-author Peter van Zonneveld for the literary biography De gefnuikte arend. Het leven van Willem Bilderdijk, 2013.
- Gerrit Komrij-prijs 2013, likewise shared with co-author Peter van Zonneveld, also for De gefnuikte arend. Het leven van Willem Bilderdijk, 2013.
- Shortlist Libris Geschiedenis Prijs 2024 (Libris History Prize, history book award), nomination for De ontdekking van Insulinde (The Discovery of Insulinde).
