= Douwe Breimer =

Dutch pharmacologist

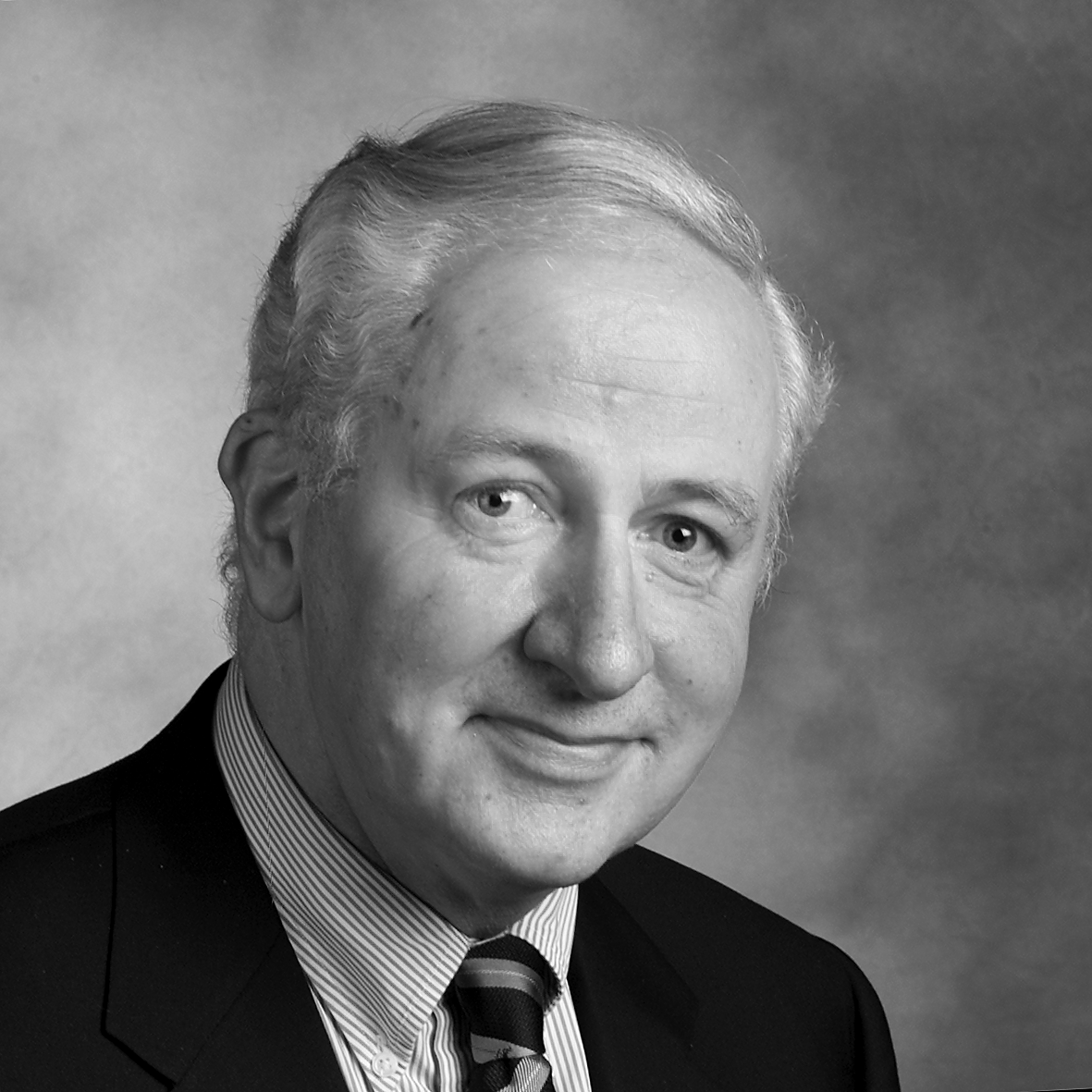
D.D. Breimer (Coll. Leiden University)

Douwe Durk Breimer (born 24 November 1943 in Oudemirdum, Netherlands) is a Dutch pharmacologist and was both rector magnificus and president of the Executive Board of Leiden University, The Netherlands.

Breimer studied pharmacology at the University of Groningen (1962–1970) and obtained his Ph.D. from the Catholic University of Nijmegen. In 1975, he was appointed professor of pharmacology at Leiden University. His research focusses on pharmacokinetics, pharmacodynamics and drug metabolism. Breimer co-authored over 500 scientific papers and supervised more than 50 Ph.D. students.

Breimer holds honorary doctorates from Ghent University, Uppsala University (1992), Semmelweis University (Budapest), the University of Navarra (Pamplona), Hoshi University (Tokyo), the University of London and the Université de Montréal.

In 1987 he became member of the Royal Netherlands Academy of Arts and Sciences. He was elected a member of Academia Europaea in 1992.

He has received the Host-Madsen medal of the International Pharmaceutical Federation (FIP), the Scheele prize of the Swedish Academy of Pharmaceutical Sciences and the Fluckiger medal of the German Pharmaceutical Society.

Academic offices
Preceded by Willem Albert Wagenaar	Rector Magnificus and President of Leiden University; 2001–2007	Succeeded by Paul F. van der Heijden
