= James Windet =

English physician

- Died: 20 November 1664; London
- Occupation: Physician

James Windet (died 20 November 1664) was an English physician.

== Biography ==
Windet is erroneously said to have been originally of Queen's College, Oxford (Foster). He graduated M.D. at Leyden on 26 June 1655, and was incorporated at Oxford on 27 March 1656. He became candidate or member of the College of Physicians of London on 25 June 1656. He at first practised at Yarmouth, but after 1656 in London. In 1660 he published in London two Latin poems, ‘Ad majestatem Caroli secundi Sylvæ duæ.’ The first begins with the word ‘occidimus,’ and is on the execution of Charles I; the second begins with the word ‘vivimus,’ and is on the Restoration. In 1663 he published ‘De vita functorum statu,’ a long Latin letter, with numerous passages in Greek, Hebrew, and Arabic, addressed to Dr. Samuel Hall, in reply to a letter from him. It begins with a general discussion of the word ‘Tartarus’ and of the Greek and Hebrew words and phrases used in describing the state of man after death, and goes on to consider the Greek and Hebrew views on the state and place of the good, on a middle state, and on the place of the wicked with related subjects. A second edition was published at Rotterdam in 1693. He was a friend of Sir Thomas Browne. Simon Wilkin, who had examined Windet's letters to Browne, states that they are uninteresting and pedantic. He died in Milk Street, London, on 20 November 1664 (Smyth, Obituary, p. 62). Wood (Fasti Oxon. ii. 790) states that he left a quarto manuscript of Latin poems.
