= Fatihya Abdi =

Dutch politician (born 1991)

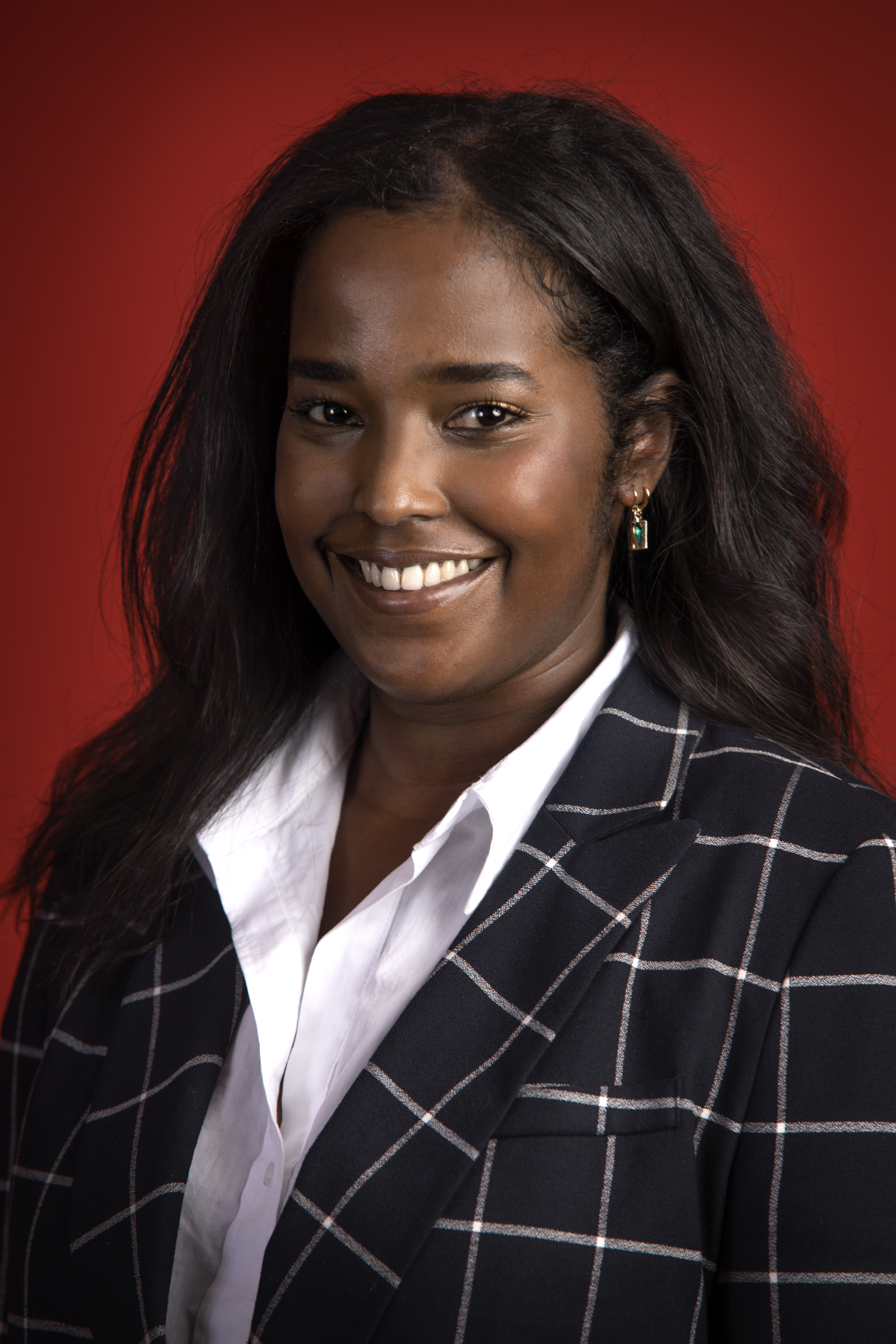
- Abdi in 2020

Member of the House of Representatives
- Incumbent
- Assumed office 12 November 2025

Member of the Amsterdam Municipal Council
- In office 16 March 2022 – 11 November 2025

Personal details
- Born: 12 March 1991 (age 35) Wageningen, Netherlands
- Party: Labour Party (2008–2026); PRO (from 2026)
- Education: University of Amsterdam; Leiden University

Fatihya Abdi (born 12 March 1991) is a Dutch politician who was elected member of the House of Representatives in 2025. She has been a municipal councillor of Amsterdam since 2022. From 2011 to 2013, she served as international representative of the Young Socialists.
