= Jane Grogan =

Immunologist and cancer research executive (born 1966)

Jane L. Grogan
- Citizenship: Australia
- Education: University of Melbourne (BSc); Leiden University (PhD)
- Scientific career
- Fields: Immunology; cancer immunotherapy
- Workplaces: Biogen, Genentech, ArsenalBio, Graphite Bio

Jane L. Grogan is an Australian-born, US-based scientist specializing in immunology and cancer research. In 2009, she was the corresponding author of the paper that first described a novel inhibitory immune receptor that became a drug target in cancer immunotherapy. Grogan is currently the executive vice president and head of research at Biogen.

== Education ==
Grogan completed her undergraduate degree in biochemistry and pharmacology at the University of Melbourne, Australia and a PhD in Immunology at Leiden University in the Netherlands. Her post-doctoral training was at the German Rheumatism Research Centre Berlin (DRFZ) in Berlin as an Alexander von Humboldt Fellow. She then moved to the United States to take up a position as a Howard Hughes Fellow at the University of California, San Francisco.

== Career ==
Grogan joined Genentech in 2004 and spent the next fifteen years there. Her positions included principal scientist in cancer immunology and head of adaptive tumor immunity. She founded and was the original host of the science journalism podcast produced by Genentech called Two Scientists Walk Into a Bar.

In 2019, she became the founding chief scientific officer of ArsenalBio, a cell-therapy startup. She then served as the chief scientific officer of Graphite Bio. Between these positions, she advised biotechnology companies and sat on the scientific advisory board of Bicycle Therapeutics. Since 2021, she has been on the board of the Federation of Clinical Immunology Societies.

Grogan was appointed as executive vice president and head of research at Biogen in September 2023.

== Research ==
Grogan's initial research focused on mechanisms of T cell activation, tolerance-induction and epigenetic modifiers. In 2009, Grogan and her lab at Genentech described TIGIT, an inhibitory receptor on lymphocytes that suppresses T cell activation.

She has published more than 60 papers and is an inventor on more than 20 patents.

== Select publications ==
- Manieri, Nicholas A.; Chiang, Eugene Y.; Grogan, Jane L. (January 2017). "TIGIT: A Key Inhibitor of the Cancer Immunity Cycle". Trends in Immunology. 38 (1): 20–28. doi:10.1016/j.it.2016.10.002. ISSN 1471-4981. PMID 27793572.
- Yu, Xin; Harden, Kristin; Gonzalez, Lino C.; Francesco, Michelle; Chiang, Eugene; Irving, Bryan; Tom, Irene; Ivelja, Sinisa; Refino, Canio J.; Clark, Hilary; Eaton, Dan; Grogan, Jane L. (January 2009). "The surface protein TIGIT suppresses T cell activation by promoting the generation of mature immunoregulatory dendritic cells". Nature Immunology. 10 (1): 48–57. doi:10.1038/ni.1674. ISSN 1529-2916. PMID 19011627.
- Johnston, Robert J.; Comps-Agrar, Laetitia; Hackney, Jason; Yu, Xin; Huseni, Mahrukh; Yang, Yagai; Park, Summer; Javinal, Vincent; Chiu, Henry; Irving, Bryan; Eaton, Dan L.; Grogan, Jane L. (December 8, 2014). "The immunoreceptor TIGIT regulates antitumor and antiviral CD8(+) T cell effector function". Cancer Cell. 26 (6): 923–937. doi:10.1016/j.ccell.2014.10.018. ISSN 1878-3686. PMID 25465800.
- Hering, Heike; Bussiere, Thierry; Liu, Chia-Chen; Glajch, Kelly E.; Weihofen, Andreas; Grogan, Jane; Walsh, Dominic M. (August 6, 2025). "A manifesto for Alzheimer's disease drug discovery in the era of disease-modifying therapies". Molecular Neurodegeneration. 20 (1): 88. doi:10.1186/s13024-025-00872-7. ISSN 1750-1326. PMC 12326716. PMID 40770764.
