= Evert Alkema =

Dutch jurist (1939–2022)

- Born: Evert Albert Alkema; 18 January 1939; Eelde
- Died: 12 June 2022 (aged 83); Leiden

Academic background
- Education: University of Groningen (LLM); Leiden University (PhD)
- Thesis: Studies over Europese grondrechten: de invloed van de Europese conventie op het Nederlandse recht (1978)
- Doctoral advisor: Herman Hendrik Maas

Academic work
- Discipline: Human rights law
- Institutions: University of Groningen; Leiden University

Member of the European Commission of Human Rights
- In office 1996–1999
- Preceded by: Henry G. Schermers
- Succeeded by: None (Commission abolished)

Evert Albert Alkema (18 January 1939 – 12 June 2022) was a Dutch jurist and professor of international law at Leiden University from 1984. He served on the European Commission of Human Rights from 1996 to 1999.

Alkema was born in Eelde. He obtained his PhD at Leiden University in 1978 with a thesis titled: Studies over Europese grondrechten : de invloed van de Europese conventie op het Nederlandse recht. Alkema died in Leiden.
