= Carel Stolker =

Dutch academic administrator

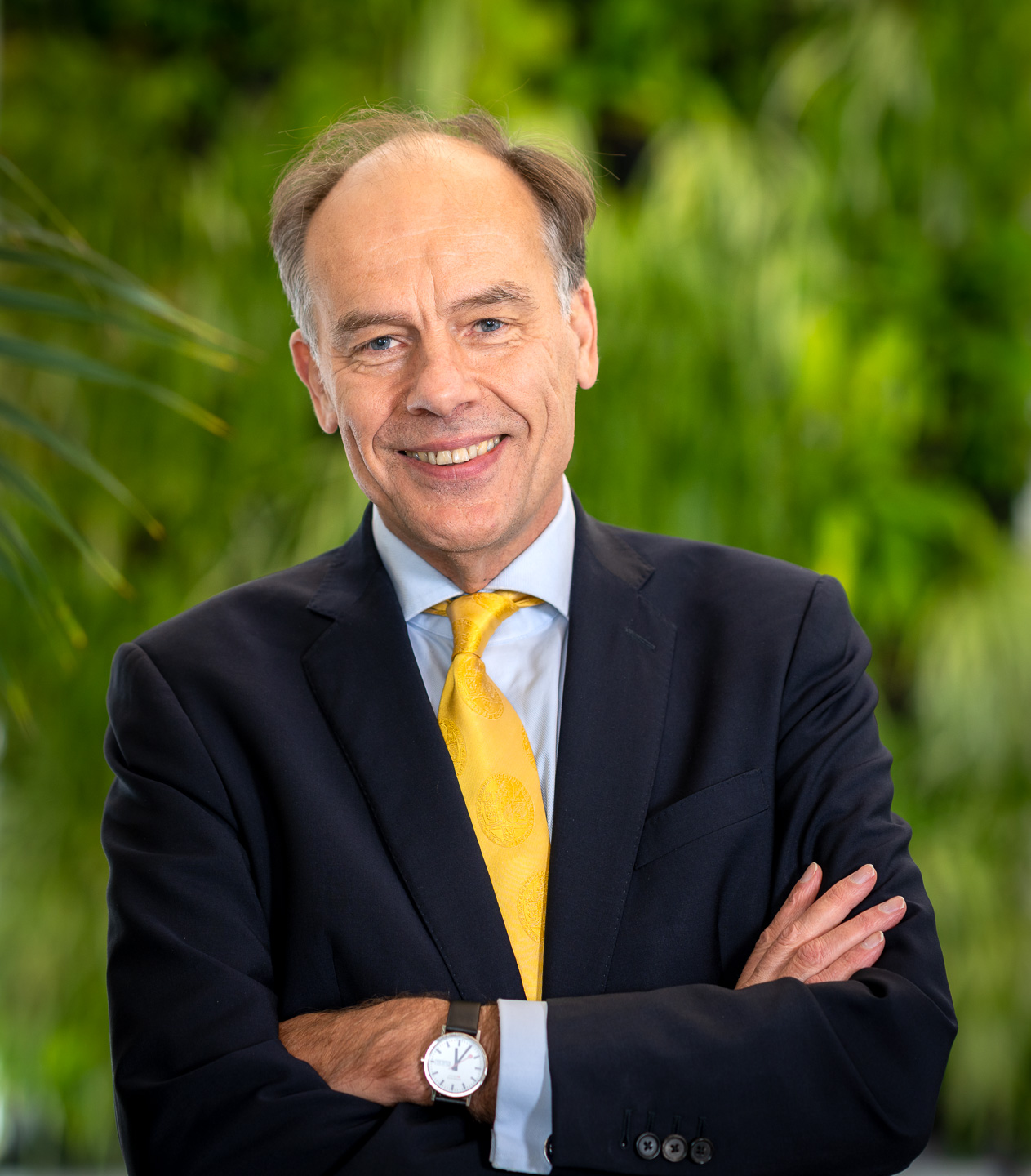
- Stolker in 2020

Rector magnificus of Leiden University
- In office 8 February 2013 – 8 February 2021
- Preceded by: Paul F. van der Heijden
- Succeeded by: Hester Bijl

President of the Executive Board of Leiden University
- In office 8 February 2013 – 8 February 2021
- Preceded by: Paul F. van der Heijden
- Succeeded by: Annetje Ottow

Personal details
- Born: Carel Jan Jozef Marie Stolker; 23 June 1954 (age 72) Leiden, Netherlands

Academic background
- Education: Leiden University (LLM, PhD)
- Thesis: Aansprakelijkheid van de arts, in het bijzonder voor mislukte sterilisaties (1988)
- Doctoral advisor: Hans Nieuwenhuis

Academic work
- Discipline: Private law
- Institutions: Leiden University
- Stolker's voice recorded February 2017

Carel Jan Jozef Marie Stolker (born 23 June 1954) is a Dutch academic administrator and the former rector magnificus and president of Leiden University from February 2013 to February 2021. He was the successor of Paul F. van der Heijden. Stolker is a professor of private law and former dean of the Leiden University Law School (2005–2011).

== Biography ==
Stolker finished high school at Bonaventura College in Leiden. After completing his military service, he studied law at Leiden University. His Ph.D. Thesis (1988) was a juridical dissertation about liability for unsuccessful sterilization. In his book Van arts naar advocaat (1989) Stolker looked at the medical liability crisis in the United States in comparison to the Dutch situation.

== Research and education ==
In 1991 Stolker taught Comparative Tort Law at the University of California, Hastings School of Law. In 1996 he became director of the E.M. Meijers Institute of Legal Studies at Leiden University and in 2001 became a member of the executive board of the law school, in charge of research. He published regularly on issues relating to liability law. From 2005 to 2011 Stolker was dean of the Faculty of Law of Leiden University. In that capacity he straightened out a long lasting dispute between former criminologist Wouter Buikhuisen and Leiden University. In 2012, a one-year sabbatical was devoted to the writing of a book about law schools – a comparative analysis of legal education, legal scholarship, and the different approaches of law schools worldwide.

== Professional life ==
In 1992 and 1993 he contributed, as a member of the Task Force Albania of the Council of Europe, to the development of a civil code for Albania. He was a member of the Air Freight Documentation Committee (the so-called Hoekstra Committee), that conducted an investigation into the cargo of the El-Al aircraft which crashed into the Amsterdam Bijlmer district. He is a deputy judge at the Court of Haarlem and a deputy justice at the Court of Appeal in 's-Hertogenbosch.

== Publications in English (selection) ==
- Carel Stolker: Rethinking the law school. Education, research, outreach and governance. Cambridge University Press, 2014. ISBN 9781107073890
- C.J.J.M. Stolker: Legal Journals: In pursuit of a more scientific approach. In: European Journal of Legal Education, 2(2), pp. 77-94 (2005)
- H.D. Ploeger & C.J.J.M. Stolker: In search of the importance of Article 1 Protocol No. 1 ECHR to private law. In: The right to property. The influence of Article 1 Protocol no. 1 ECHR on several fields of domestic law. (2000)
- Carel J.J.M. Stolker and David I. Levine: Aviation products liability for manufacturing and design defects. In: The utilization of the world's air space and free outer space in the 21st century (2000)
- Carel Stolker and David Levine: Compensation for damage to parties on the ground as a result of aviation accidents. In: Air & space law, 1997, vol. 22, nr. 2, pp. 60-60
- Carel J.J.M. Stolker: Wrongful life. The limits of liability and beyond. In: The International and Comparative Law Quarterly, 1994, p. 521 - 536
- Carel J.J.M. Stolker: The unconscious plaintiff. Consciousness as a prerequisite for compensation for non-pecuniary loss. In: The international and comparative law quarterly, vol. 39 (1990), nr 1 (Jan), p. 82

In Dutch:

- Carel Stolker: Aansprakelijkheid van de arts in het bijzonder voor mislukte sterilisaties. (Dissertation Rijksuniversiteit Leiden, 1988).

Academic offices
Preceded by Paul F. van der Heijden	Rector Magnificus of Leiden University; 2013–2021	Succeeded by Hester Bijl
