= Richard Griffiths (historian, born 1948) =

Economic historian (born 1948)

Richard T. Griffiths
- Born: 1948 (age 77–78); Isleworth, England
- Occupation: Economic historian

Academic background
- Education: University College, Swansea; University of Cambridge

Academic work
- Discipline: Economic history
- Sub-discipline: History of European integration
- Institutions: University of Manchester Institute of Science and Technology; Free University, Amsterdam; European University Institute; Leiden University

Richard Thomas Griffiths (born 7 April 1948) is an economic historian and professor emeritus of international studies at Leiden University.

== Early life ==
Griffiths was born on 7 April 1948 in Isleworth, England. He studied economic history and Russian studies at University College, Swansea, graduating with a BSc (Econ) with first-class honours in 1970, and received a PhD from the University of Cambridge in 1977. His doctoral thesis was titled Industrial Retardation in the Netherlands, 1830–1850.

== Career ==
Griffiths became a lecturer in European studies at the University of Manchester Institute of Science and Technology in 1973. From 1980 to 1987, he was professor of economic and social history at the Free University, Amsterdam.

From 1987 to 1995, Griffiths was professor of contemporary history at the European University Institute in Florence, where he directed a research project on the history of European integration. In 1995, he became professor of economic and social history at Leiden University.
