= Paul F. van der Heijden =

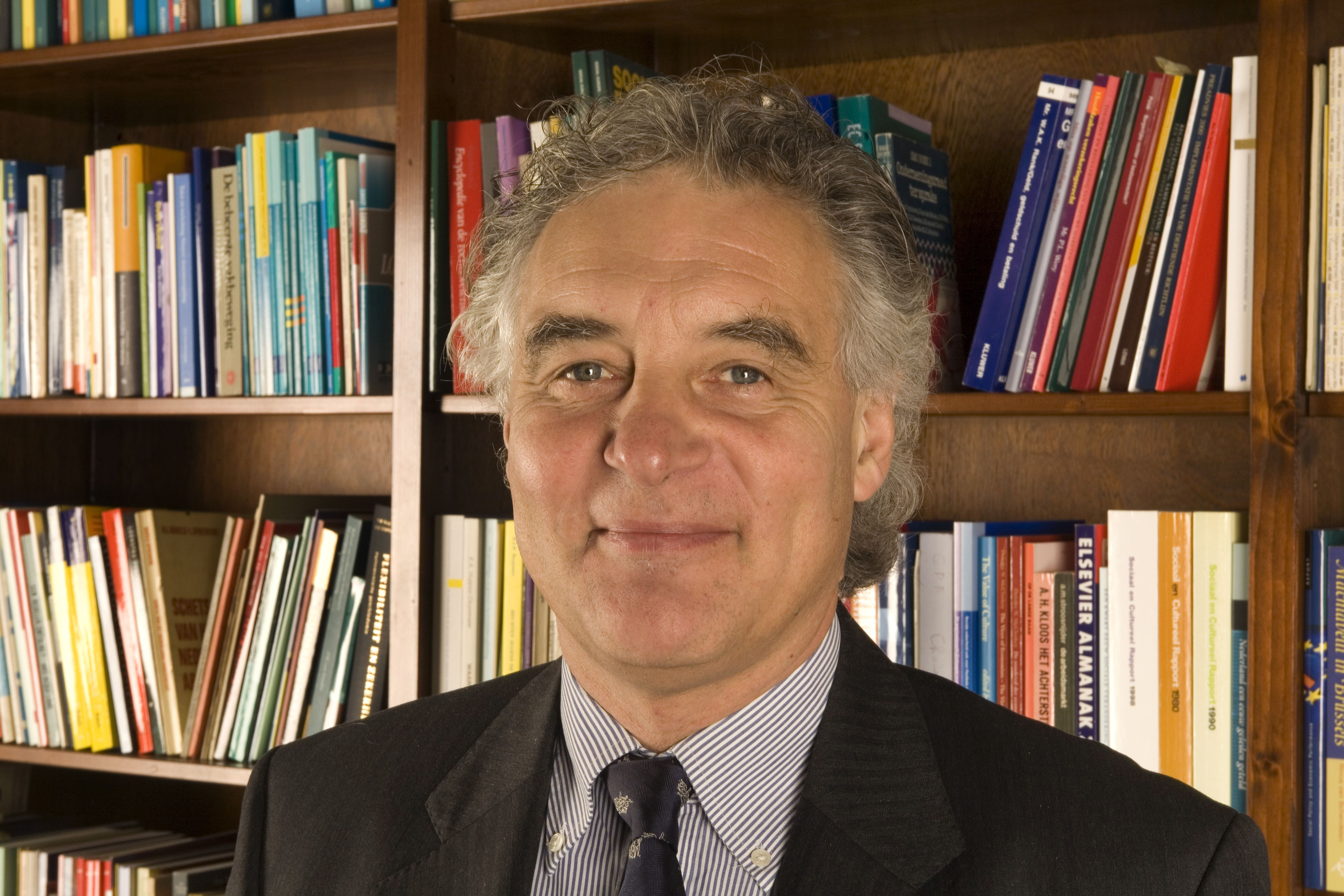
Paul van der Heijden

Paul F. van der Heijden (born 18 September 1949 in Utrecht) is professor of international labour law at Leiden University, the Netherlands. From February 2007 up to 2013 he was rector magnificus and president of the same university. Van der Heijden is a member of the Royal Netherlands Academy of Arts and Sciences since 2003.

== Biography ==
Van der Heijden obtained his LLM degree from the University of Amsterdam in 1974, and his PhD degree from Leiden University in 1984. His dissertation was entitled Fair trial in labour law (Kluwer, 1984). Van der Heijden has been active as an academic, executive, and judge/arbitrator. Soon after obtaining his doctoral degree, he became a judge at the Amsterdam District Court of Law. In 1990, he was appointed professor of labour law at the University of Amsterdam, where he became Rector in 2002. In 2007, he returned to Leiden University, where he was appointed President and Rector of the university. In February 2013 Van der Heijden was succeeded by Carel Stolker.

== Intellectual Interests and Research ==
Van der Heijden’s academic publications focus on fundamentals of labour law, industrial relations, corporate governance, and public government. His publications appeared in both Dutch and international outlets. For example, together with European colleagues (e.g., Alain Supiot and Peter Hanau), he published Beyond employment: Changes in work and the future of labour law in Europe. (Oxford University Press, 2001).

== International Labour Organization ==
From 1995 to 2001, Van der Heijden chaired the Dutch delegation at the International Labour Conference (ILC) of the International Labour Organization (ILO) in Geneva. Also, from 2002 to 2017 he was the independent President of the Governing Body Committee on Freedom of Association of the ILO.

Academic offices
Preceded by Douwe Breimer	Rector Magnificus and President of Leiden University; 2007–2013	Succeeded by Carel Stolker
