= Yana Rudenko =

Ukrainian young professional and activist

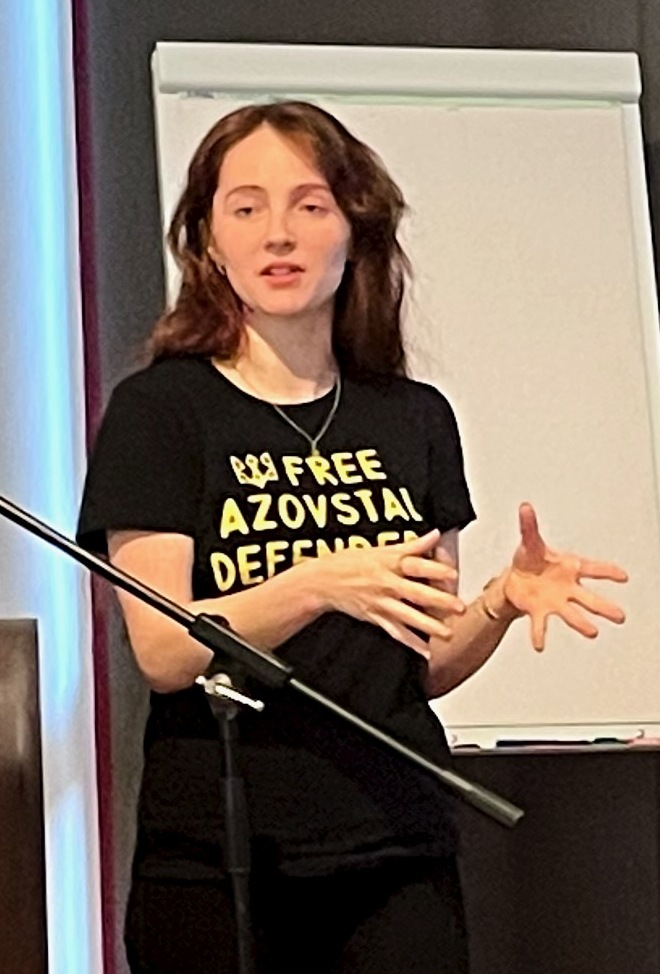
- Education: Economics and Management (Bachelor's, Lviv), Public Administration (Master's, Leiden University)
- Occupations: Speaker on justice and cultural awareness
- Organization(s): Adriatic-Baltic-Black-Azov (ABBA) Student Association; DroneAid Collective
- Known for: Activism, public speaking, social media advocacy

Yana Rudenko (Ukrainian: Яна Руденко; born 1999) is a Ukrainian young professional, activist, and survivor of the Russian invasion of Ukraine. Her work focuses on promoting justice, accountability for war crimes, and cultural awareness of Eastern Europe.

== Early life and education ==
Rudenko was born and raised in Cherkasy Oblast, Ukraine. She pursued a bachelor's degree in economics and management at Lviv Polytechnic. During the initial stages of the 2022 Russian invasion, she was in Bucha, where she experienced weeks under Russian occupation, witnessing war crimes and enduring harsh conditions without basic necessities.

== Career and activism ==
In mid-2022, in the aftermath of the Russian invasion of Ukraine, Rudenko relocated to the Netherlands as a refugee. Her experiences shaped her decision to study public administration at Leiden University Campus The Hague to contribute to global peace and justice. She has spoken at international events, including the Cleveringa Meeting in The Hague, where she shared her personal experiences and highlighted the importance of accountability for Russia's aggression.

Yana Rudenko is the founder and president of the Adriatic-Baltic-Black-Azov (ABBA) Student Association. ABBA aims to foster understanding of Eastern European cultures and politics while addressing the ongoing effects of the Russo-Ukrainian war.

Ms. Rudenko is also a co-founder of the DroneAid Collective, an initiative based in the Netherlands that engages displaced Ukrainians and rehabilitating veterans in building drones for use by the Armed Forces of Ukraine. DroneAid Collective collaborates with the nonprofit Eyes on Ukraine, which supplies drones and humanitarian resources to the frontlines of the conflict.

== Social media and advocacy ==
Rudenko uses social media to raise awareness of war crimes and combat misinformation. She has organised fundraising campaigns, raising more than €8,000 for humanitarian aid to Ukraine. Her activism also highlights the oppression of minority groups, such as Crimean Tatars and Circassians, and the need for global accountability against aggression.
