= André van Zundert =

Belgian anaesthesiologist and academic

- Citizenship: Belgian
- Education: KU Leuven; Leiden University; University of Queensland
- Scientific career
- Fields: Anaesthesiology
- Workplaces: University of Queensland; Royal Brisbane and Women's Hospital

André van Zundert is a Belgian anaesthesiologist and academic. His research has included regional anaesthesia, airway management and the mechanisms of general anaesthetics. He is Professor and Chair of the Discipline of Anaesthesiology at the Royal Brisbane and Women’s Hospital and a Professor of Medicine at the University of Queensland.

== Education and career ==
Van Zundert earned his Doctor of Medicine from the University of Leuven in 1978 and a PhD from the University of Leyden in 1985. He obtained a Doctorate in Medicine by Research at the University of Queensland in 2024.

From 1995 to 2013, Van Zundert served as director of anaesthesia training at Catharina Hospital in Eindhoven. He also held academic appointments at Ghent University from 2001 to 2018 and Maastricht University from 2009 to 2018.

In 2013 he was appointed Professor and Chair of the Discipline of Anaesthesiology at the Royal Brisbane and Women’s Hospital and Professor in the Faculty of Medicine at the University of Queensland.

He served as Secretary General of the European Society of Regional Anaesthesia and Pain Therapy from 1990 to 2000 and as its President from 2000 to 2003.

Van Zundert received the Lennard Travers Professorship and the ANZCA Medal from the Australian and New Zealand College of Anaesthetists in 2023. In 2024, he received the Australian Medical Association’s Excellence in Healthcare Award and was appointed Commander of the Order of the Crown of Belgium. He received the Carl Koller Gold Medal from the European Society of Regional Anaesthesia and Pain Therapy in 2025.

In April 2026, the André van Zundert Research and Education Centre was inaugurated at the Shenzhen Brain Science and Technology Industry Innovation Center in Shenzhen, China, with van Zundert appointed as its chairperson.

== Research ==
Van Zundert's research has focused on anaesthesia and airway management. He has co-authored studies on epidural test dosing and methods to detect inadvertent intravascular or intrathecal catheter placement in labour analgesia. In 1997 he co-authored descriptions of combined spinal-epidural techniques and segmental thoracic spinal anaesthesia for high-risk surgical patients. His subsequent regional anaesthesia work has included neuraxial techniques, peripheral nerve blocks, ophthalmic regional blocks and ultrasound-guided techniques. He has published on videolaryngoscopy and supraglottic airway devices.

In 2024, he co-authored a review of supraglottic airway devices in Anesthesia & Analgesia. He was subsequently among the authors of European guidelines on the implementation of videolaryngoscopy, published in 2025. In 2026, he co-edited Evidence-based Guide to Difficult Airway Management with Manuel Ángel Gómez-Ríos, published by Springer. Van Zundert has also collaborated with researchers at the Queensland Brain Institute on the mechanisms of general anaesthesia and potential reversal strategies to improve recovery after anaesthesia.
