= Adrienne d'Aulnis de Bourouill =

Dutch lawyer

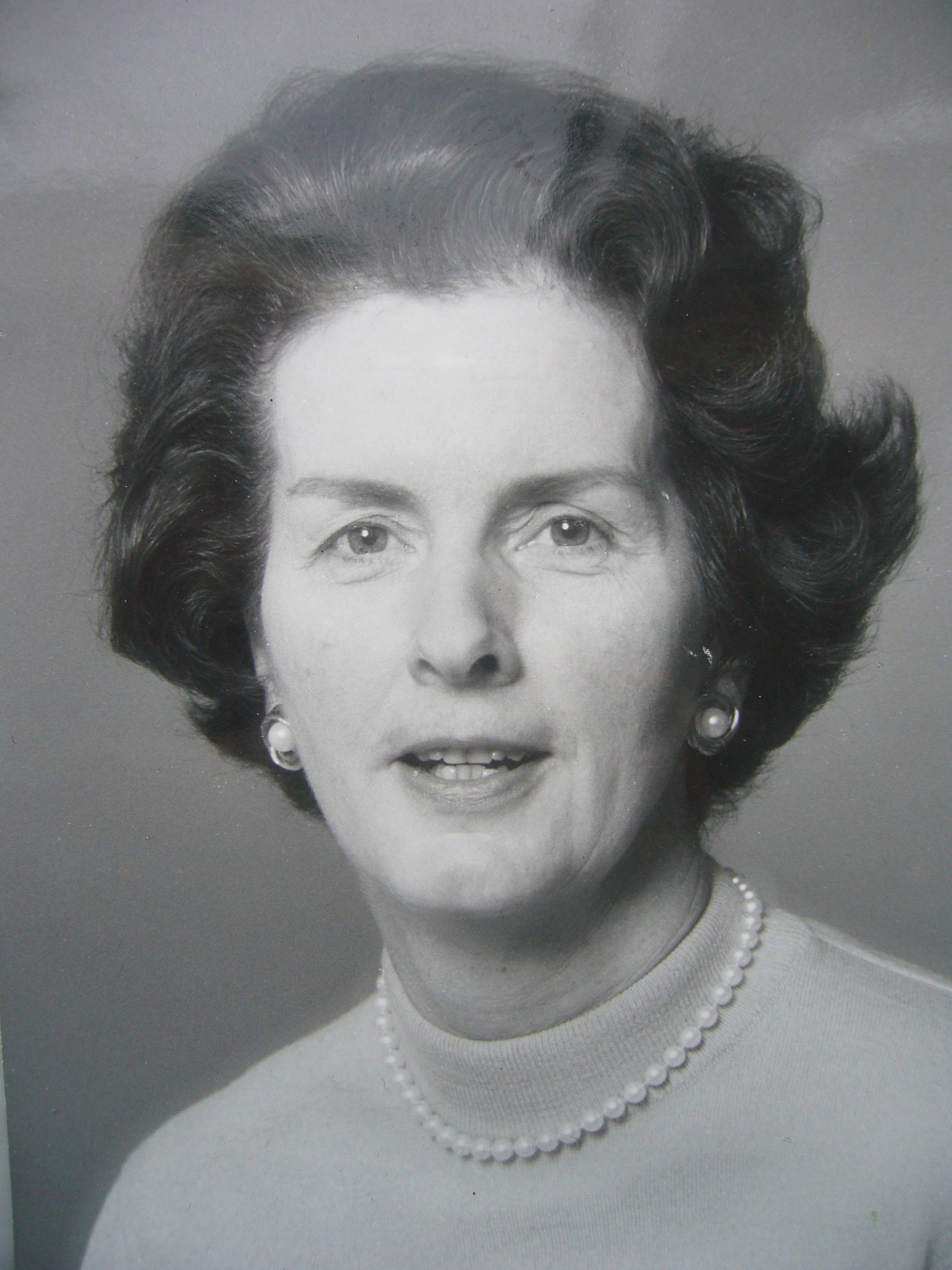
Adrienne d'Aulnis de Bourouill in 1970

Hester Adrienne Henriëtte baroness d'Aulnis de Bourouill (3 September 1920 in The Hague – 29 December 1996) was a Dutch lawyer who dealt mainly with medical ethical issues.

D'Aulnis de Bourouill was co-founder of the Dutch Foundation for Voluntary Euthanasia (NVVE) and was secretary until 1985, when the foundation was dissolved. For her contributions, she was appointed Officer in the Order of Orange-Nassau.
