= Sally Shuttleworth =

Sally Ann Shuttleworth CBE FBA (born 5 September 1952) is a British academic specialising in Victorian literature. She is Professor of English Literature at the University of Oxford and a Professorial Fellow of St Anne's College, Oxford. From 2006 to 2011, she was Head of the Humanities Division, University of Oxford. From 2014 to 2019 she was a principal investigator on the Diseases of Modern Life project, a multidisciplinary research initiative exploring nineteenth century scientific and cultural ideas related to stress and information overload.

She was educated at the University of York (BA English Literature and Sociology 1974), and Darwin College, Cambridge (PhD English Literature 1980). She then lectured in English at Princeton University, the University of Leeds and the University of Sheffield. She has appeared on Woman's Hour.

On 16 July 2015, she was elected a Fellow of the British Academy (FBA). She was appointed Commander of the Order of the British Empire (CBE) in the 2021 Birthday Honours for services to the study of English literature.

== Books ==
=== Author ===
- George Eliot and Nineteenth-Century Science (1984)
- Charlotte Brontë and Victorian Psychology (1996)
- The Mind of the Child: Child Development in Literature, Science and Medicine, 1840–1900 (2010)
- Anxious Times: Medicine and Modernity in Nineteenth-Century Britain (2019) - coauthor

=== Editor ===
- Embodied Selves: An Anthology of Psychological Texts 1830-1890
- Two on a Tower by Thomas Hardy (1999)
- The Lifted Veil and Brother Jacob by George Eliot (2004)
- Science in the Nineteenth-Century Periodical: An Electronic Index, v. 4.0, hriOnline (2004–20)
- Lorna Doone: A Romance of Exmoor by R. D. Blackmore (2008)
- Body/Politics: Women and the Discourses of Science co-edited with Mary Jacobus and Evelyn Fox Keller (2013)
