= Johann Peter Berg =

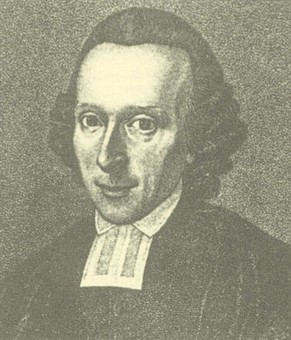
Johann Peter Berg

Johann Peter Berg (September 3, 1737 – March 3, 1800) was a German Protestant theologian, historian, and Orientalist.

Berg was born in Bremen, and studied at Leiden University. In 1762 he became Professor of Greek and Oriental languages at the University of Bremen, but moved in 1763 to the University of Duisburg, where he taught nearly until his death in Duisburg in 1800. He translated various Arabic works, and lectured on a wide range of theological subjects. He also published an annotated copy of the Arabic dictionary of Golius, which served as the basis for that of Freytag.

== Works ==
- Specimen Philol. ad Selecta V. T. Loca (Leiden, 1761)
- Reformationsgeschichte der Länder Jülich, Cleve, Berg, Mark (Hamm, 1826, ed. by Tross)
