= Leo van de Putte =

Dutch medical scientist

Levinus Boudewijn Abraham "Leo" van de Putte
- Born: January 29, 1941 (age 85); Rotterdam, Netherlands
- Education: Leiden University
- Known for: Research in chronic inflammatory diseases, Rheumatoid arthritis, TNF-blocking agents, Immunology
- Scientific career
- Fields: Rheumatology, Internal Medicine
- Workplaces: Radboud University Nijmegen, Leiden University Medical Centre

Levinus Boudewijn Abraham "Leo" van de Putte (born 29 January 1941) is a Dutch rheumatologist and clinical investigator who is an emeritus professor of internal medicine and rheumatology at the Radboud University Nijmegen. His research activities contributed to insights into the pathogenesis of arthritis, the development of new diagnostic tools, and targeted therapies for chronic inflammatory arthritis, including rheumatoid arthritis. Between 1977 and 2012, he was also active at the international level, including clinical studies as well as activities related to the organisation of rheumatology in Europe.

== Education ==
Van de Putte studied medicine at Leiden University, graduated as MD in 1967, and completed a PhD in nephrology ("Recurrent or persistent hematuria: sign of mesangial immune complex disease") in 1974. He had a full training in internal medicine and rheumatology at the Leiden University Medical Centre (1967-1974). He also studied violin with violinist Nap de Klijn and at the Hague Royal Conservatory. As a violinist, he was a regular soloist with student orchestras.

== Career ==
Van de Putte was a professor of internal medicine and rheumatology at Radboud University Nijmegen in the Netherlands (1977-2003) and department chair of rheumatology at the Radboud University Medical Centre (1977-2003) and the Sint Maartens Kliniek in Nijmegen (1998-2002). He was chairman of the medical council of the Royal Dutch Academy of Arts and Sciences, among others involved in the 1998 nation-wide quality-assessment of Dutch medical research. From 1994 to 2012, he was president of the Bertine Koperberg Foundation, organising regular international meetings on scientific topics in rheumatology and autoimmunity.

Van de Putte has also been active at the international level. He was one of the initiators of the European Workshop for Rheumatology Research, organizing annual meetings for predominantly young researchers in the field. From 1995 to 1997, he served as president of the European League Against Rheumatism (EULAR). From 1999 to 2008, he was chief editor of the scientific journal Annals of the Rheumatic Diseases, after it became the official EULAR journal.

After the fall of the Berlin Wall in 1989, and at the invitation of the German Government, van de Putte was an international advisor for the reorganisation of former East German universities, including in Jena and Berlin. In 2011, he was awarded the Great Cross of the Order of Merit of the Federal Republic of Germany for his contributions to the field of rheumatology.

== Research ==
Van de Putte’s research activities at the Radboud University Medical Centre have focused on chronic inflammatory processes, particularly rheumatoid arthritis. His research group studied factors determining the expression and chronicity of joint inflammation, in particular the distinct role of individual structures of the synovial joint, including cartilage and synovial lining cells. Additional studies in experimental arthritis indicated extensive inflammatory changes not only in the joint capsule but also in periarticular tissues, including ligaments, bone, and muscles. Furthermore, a relationship between the severity and duration of arthritis on the one hand, and irreversible destruction of bone and cartilage on the other, could be demonstrated.

Van de Putte also played a leading role in the early and seminal studies on the biological D2E7, one of the first TNF-blocking agents currently known as adalimumab. This TNF-blocking biologic agent has proven to be a successful treatment modality for a broad array of chronic inflammatory diseases, including rheumatoid arthritis.

In 1998, his clinical research group was involved in the introduction and implementation of the anti-cyclic citrullinated peptides (anti-CCP) test in rheumatology, currently an important diagnostic tool for rheumatoid arthritis. This test was developed by the group of Walther van Venrooij at the Department of Biochemistry, Radboud University Nijmegen.

== Honours and awards ==
- Honorary Fellow of the Royal College of Physicians (FRCP) (1997)
- Honorary member of the European League Against Rheumatism (EULAR) (1998)
- Honorary member of the Dutch Society for Rheumatology (2000)
- Jan van Breemen medal (2000)
- Medal of Honour of the Swedish Society of Medicine (2000)
- Great Cross of the Order of Merit of the Federal Republic of Germany (2011)
- Franziskus Blondel medal of the city of Aachen (2002)
- Honorary member of the German Society for Rheumatology (2004)
- Master Award, American College of Rheumatology (2007)
- Meritorious Service Award, European League Against Rheumatism (2009)
- Knighted as Officer of the Order of Orange-Nassau (2011)
- Carol Nachman medal, city of Wiesbaden
