= Tinde van Andel =

Ethnobotanist

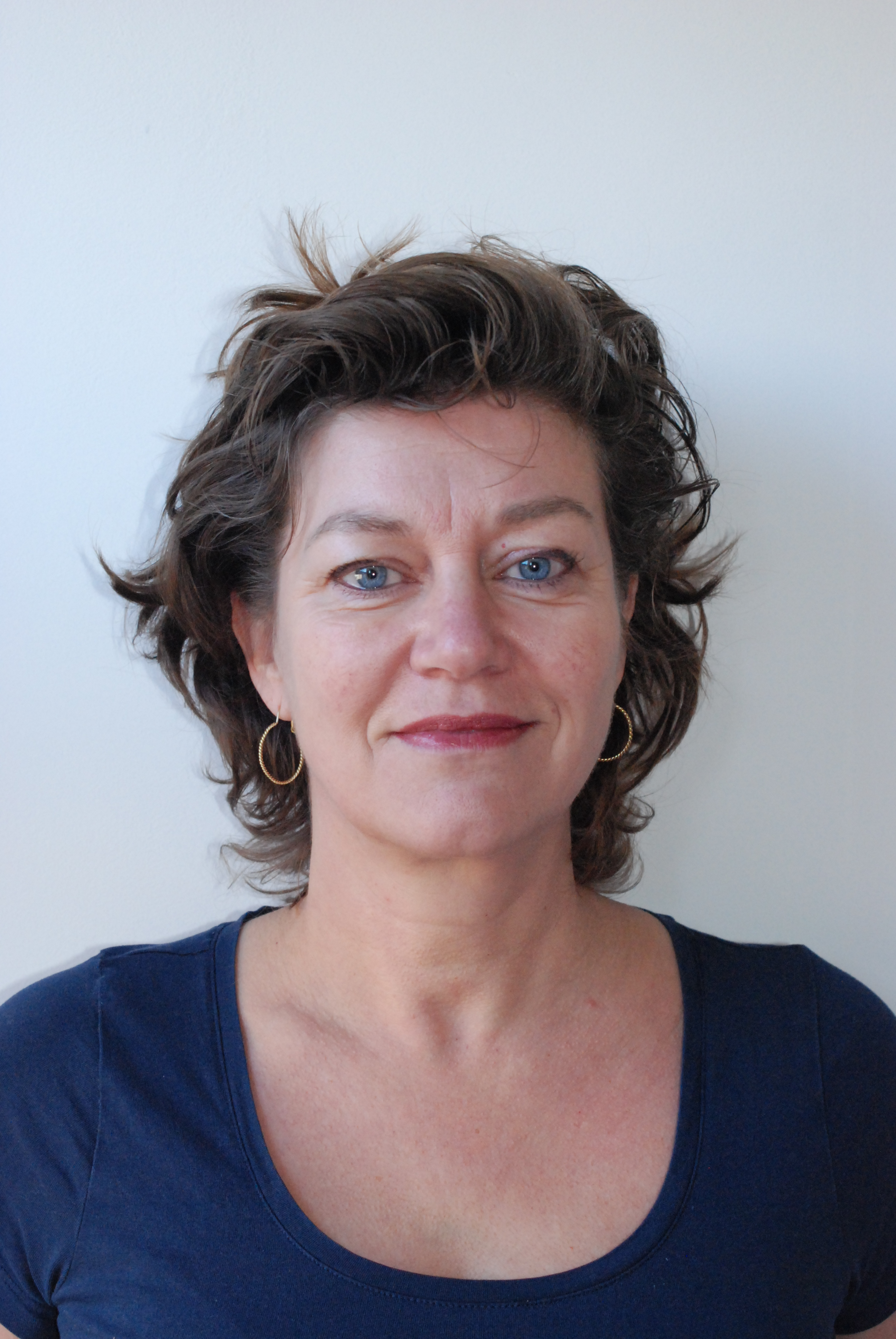
- Scientific career
- Fields: Ethnobotany
- Institutions: University of Leiden, Wageningen University, Utrecht University, Naturalis Biodiversity Center

Tinde van Andel is an ethnobotanist. She is appointed as Special Professor of History of Botany and Gardens and the Clausius Chair at Leiden University. Using ethnobotany and genomics, she studies how human populations and plant species migrated from Africa to the New World.

== Research and career ==
Van Andel studies historic botanical collections and knowledge systems behind them. She aims to digitize and "decolonize" these collections to improve accessibility to both researchers and to the people in the countries where the plants and knowledge originally came from.

Van Andel graduated with a Master's degree in Biology from the University of Amsterdam. She earned her PhD in Ethnobotany from the National Herbarium of the Netherlands, Utrecht University in 2000 and stayed on to complete her postdoc from 2005-2009. From 2010-2015, van Andel conducted a second postdoc at Naturalis and Leiden University. She was granted an NWO Vidi Award in 2009, titled "Plantgebruik uit moeder Afrika" (in English, "Plant use from Mother Africa").

in 2015, van Andel was appointed Special Professor of Ethobotany at Wageningen University, and later that year as Special Professor of History of Botany and Gardens at Leiden University, where she holds the Clausius Chair.

== Awards and honors ==
NWO Vidi Award

NWO ENW-KLEIN grant for innovative research (2020)
