= Marcel R.M. van den Brink =

Dutch oncologist and researcher

- Born: November 14, 1960 (age 65); Oegstgeest, Netherlands
- Education: University of Leiden, Netherlands
- Spouse: Lia Palomba
- Children: Lucas van den Brink, Alessandro van den Brink
- Scientific career
- Fields: hematology, oncology, immunology
- Workplaces: City of Hope National Medical Center, Memorial Sloan Kettering Cancer Center, Sloan Kettering Institute, Weill Graduate School of Medical Sciences

Marcel R.M. van den Brink (born November 14, 1960) is a Dutch oncologist and researcher known for his research in hematopoietic stem cell transplantation for cancer patients.

== Career ==
van den Brink obtained his M.D. and Ph.D. from the University of Leiden, completed a postdoctoral fellowship at the Pittsburgh Cancer Institute in Pittsburgh, PA and residency at Duke University Medical Center in Durham, NC. From 1994 to 1997, van den Brink was a Clinical Fellow in Hematology and Oncology at Beth Israel Deaconess Medical Center and a Clinical Fellow in Medicine at Harvard Medical School in Boston, MA. He then carried out a post-doctoral fellowship at the Dana Farber Cancer Institute in Boston, MA from 1995 to 1999.

From 1999 to 2023, he served at Memorial Sloan Kettering Cancer Center as chief of the Adult Bone Marrow Transplantation Service and subsequently as Head of the Division of Hematologic Malignancies. He was also Alan Houghton Chair in Immunology at Memorial Sloan Kettering Cancer Center (MSKCC) and Professor at Gerstner Sloan Kettering Graduate School of Biomedical Sciences and Weill Cornell Graduate School of Medical Sciences. From 2015 to 2022, he was the Co-Director of the Parker Institute for Cancer Immunotherapy at MSK.

Currently, he is President of City of Hope Los Angeles and National Medical Center, Chief Physician Executive and Deana and Steve Campbell Distinguished Chair.

He is Vice Chairman of DKMS Stiftung Leben Spenden Foundation Board and Chairman of the DKMS Medical Council. He is a member of the American Society for Clinical Investigation and the Association of American Physicians. He has been elected to the Royal Netherlands Academy of Arts and Sciences (Koninklijke Nederlandse Akademie van Wetenschappen, or KNAW) as a Foreign Member of Medical, Biomedical and Health Sciences. KNAW Members consist of leading scientists across all disciplines and are chosen for their scientific achievements.

== Research ==
As a physician-scientist, van den Brink studies cancer immunotherapy with a special interest in intestinal microbiome, chimeric antigen receptor (CAR) therapy, and thymic regeneration.

Van den Brink has made a large number of discoveries regarding the role of the thymus in immune reconstitution after bone marrow transplantation, the pathophysiology of graft-versus-host disease and how changes in the gut flora can affect bone marrow transplantation. From years of research on the relationship between microbiota and GVHD, he has discovered that antibiotic treatment slows down regrowth of immune cells after transplant by depleting gut flora, lactose in the diet feeds dangerous gut bacteria when the immune system is compromised in mice, and a bacterial species called Blautia producta can prevent infections and GVHD in bone marrow transplantation patients. He has published over 200 articles that have helped improve therapeutic strategies for cancer patients.

== Awards ==
- 1996 Physician Scientist Award, Howard Hughes Medical Institute
- 1999 Amy Strelzer Manasevit Scholar Award
- 2001 Damon Runyon Scholar Award, Cancer Research Fund
- 2004 Member of the American Society for Clinical Investigation
- 2013 Member of the Association of American Physicians
- 2014 Immunology Letters Lecture Award, European Federation of Immunological Societies
- 2015 Delete Blood Cancer Award, DKMS
- 2015 Till and McCulloch Lectureship Award
- 2020 Foreign member of the Royal Netherlands Academy of Arts and Sciences

== Selected publications ==
- Nguyen CL, Markey KA, Miltiadous O, Dai A, Waters N, Sadeghi K, et al. (2023). "High-resolution analyses of associations between medications, microbiome, and mortality in cancer patients". Cell. 186 (12): 2705–2718.e17. doi:10.1016/j.cell.2023.05.007. PMC 10390075. PMID 37295406.
- Schluter J, Peled JU, Taylor BP, Markey KA, Smith M, Taur Y, et al. (2020). "The gut microbiota is associated with immune cell dynamics in humans". Nature. 588 (7837): 303–307. Bibcode:2020Natur.588..303S. doi:10.1038/s41586-020-2971-8. PMC 7725892. PMID 33239790.
- Peled JU, Gomes A, Devlin SM, Littmann ER, Taur Y, Sung AD, et al. (2020). "Microbiota as Predictor of Mortality in Allogeneic Hematopoietic-Cell Transplantation". N Engl J Med. 382 (9): 822–834. doi:10.1056/NEJMoa1900623. PMC 7534690. PMID 32101664.
- Tsai JJ, Dudakov JA, Takahashi K, Shieh JH, Velardi E, Holland AM, et al. (2013). "Nrf2 regulates haematopoietic stem cell function". Nat Cell Biol. 15 (3): 309–16. doi:10.1038/ncb2699. PMC 3699879. PMID 23434824.
- Hanash AM, Dudakov JA, Hua G, O'Connor MH, Young LF, Singer NV, et al. (2012). "Interleukin-22 protects intestinal stem cells from immune-mediated tissue damage and regulates sensitivity to graft versus host disease". Immunity. 37 (2): 339–50. doi:10.1016/j.immuni.2012.05.028. PMC 3477611. PMID 22921121.
- Jenq RR, Ubeda C, Taur Y, Menezes CC, Khanin R, Dudakov JA, et al. (2012). "Regulation of intestinal inflammation by microbiota following allogeneic bone marrow transplantation". J Exp Med. 209 (5): 903–11. doi:10.1084/jem.20112408. PMC 3348096. PMID 22547653.
- Dudakov JA, Hanash AM, Jenq RR, Young LF, Ghosh A, Singer NV, et al. (2012). "Interleukin-22 drives endogenous thymic regeneration in mice". Science. 336 (6077): 91–5. Bibcode:2012Sci...336...91D. doi:10.1126/science.1218004. PMC 3616391. PMID 22383805.
- Zakrzewski JL, Suh D, Markley JC, Smith OM, King C, Goldberg GL, et al. (2008). "Tumor immunotherapy across MHC barriers using allogeneic T-cell precursors". Nat Biotechnol. 26 (4): 453–61. doi:10.1038/nbt1395. PMC 2731996. PMID 18376399.
- Zakrzewski JL, Kochman AA, Lu SX, Terwey TH, Kim TD, Hubbard VM, et al. (2006). "Adoptive transfer of T-cell precursors enhances T-cell reconstitution after allogeneic hematopoietic stem cell transplantation". Nature Medicine. 12 (9): 1039–1047. doi:10.1038/nm1463. PMID 16936725.
- Schmaltz C, Alpdogan O, Kappel BJ, Muriglan SJ, Rotolo JA, Ongchin J, et al. (2002). "T cells require TRAIL for optimal graft-versus-tumor activity". Nature Medicine. 8 (12): 1433–1437. doi:10.1038/nm797. PMID 12426560.
