= Henry G. Schermers =

Dutch legal scholar

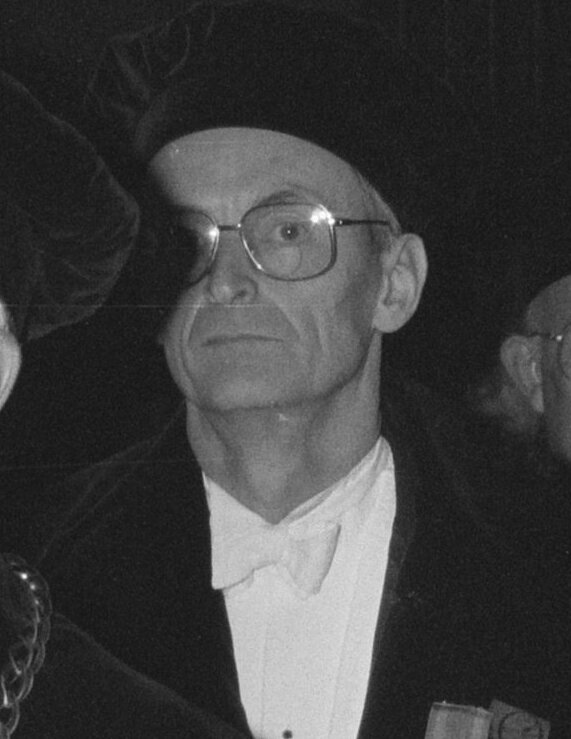
- Schermers (1988)
- Born: Henricus Gerhard Schermers; 27 September 1928; Vaassen, Netherlands
- Died: 31 August 2006 (aged 77); Leiden, Netherlands
- Spouse: Hotsche Tans
- Children: 3
- Awards: Knight in the Order of the Netherlands Lion; Commander in the Order of Orange-Nassau

Academic background
- Education: Stedelijk Gymnasium Apeldoorn
- Alma mater: Leiden University (LLM, PhD)
- Thesis: De gespecialiseerde organisaties: Hun bouw en inrichting (1957)
- Doctoral advisor: Frederik Mari van Asbeck

Academic work
- Discipline: International law
- Sub-discipline: International institutional law, law of the European Union, human rights law
- School or tradition: Functionalism
- Institutions: Leiden University (1978–2002); University of Amsterdam (1963–1978)
- Notable students: Prince Constantijn of the Netherlands
- Notable works: International Institutional Law: Unity within Diversity; Judicial Protection in the European Communities

Member of the European Commission of Human Rights
- In office 1981–1996
- Preceded by: Carel Polak
- Succeeded by: Evert Alkema
- Website: universiteitleiden.nl

Henricus Gerhard "Hein" Schermers (27 September 1928, Vaassen – 31 August 2006, Leiden) was a Dutch legal scholar who worked in public international law, mainly in the fields of the law of international organizations, the law of the European Union. and European human rights law. He played a key role in developing these subjects through his writings. He was professor of the law of international organizations at the University of Amsterdam and at Leiden University. He was also for some time a member of the European Commission of Human Rights and a civil servant at the Netherlands ministry of Foreign Affairs.

== Biography ==
Schermers grew up in Vaassen, in the province of Gelderland. He studied law at Leiden University from 1947 tot 1953; one of his fellow students was Jos Kapteyn. After graduation joined the Netherlands ministry of Foreign Affairs in the directorate for international organizations, where he dealt with the rapid growth of international organizations after World War II. He noticed that many of these organizations faced similar problems in their functioning and structure, which prompted him to write his doctoral thesis on the subject of the specialized organizations of the United Nations. His thesis, titled De gespecialiseerde organisaties: Hun bouw en inrichting (The Specialized Organizations: Their Structure and Organization), which he defended on 9 October 1957, suggested merging the United Nations and its specialized agencies, comparing the agencies' position to that of the Vatican between 1870 and 1929 (an international legal person, but lacking some aspects). His doctoral supervisor was professor Frederik Mari van Asbeck, who would later become the first Dutch judge on the European Court of Human Rights; Van Asbeck's work was a great influence on Schermers' doctoral thesis.

In 1963 Schermers was appointed lector (roughly equivalent to reader) in the law of international organizations and the European Communities at the University of Amsterdam at the suggestion of Arnold Tammes. Two years later he was promoted to full professor in the law of international organizations, the second chair in the field in the Netherlands (the first having been created in Leiden for Ivo Samkalden). He served as secretary of the Amsterdam law faculty in 1965-1968 and was a visiting professor at the University of Michigan in 1968-1969. He also was a member of the (provisional) High Council of the European University Institute and a substitute judge of the Amsterdam Court of Appeal for several years. He also worked in the emerging field of European law, being involved in the founding of the journal Legal Issues of Economic Integration in 1974 and co-authoring the book Judicial Remedies in the European Communities with Laurens Jan Brinkhorst.

In 1978 Schermers left Amsterdam to take up the chair in the law of international organizations at his alma mater, Leiden University. He delivered his inaugural address, Integratie van internationale organisaties (Integration of International Organizations) on 30 June of that year; he had delivered is valedictory lecture at the UvA, titled The Communities under the European Convention on Human Rights, one day earlier. He also became director of Leiden's Europa Institute and executive editor of the journal Common Market Law Review.

Amongst his notable books International Institutional Law and Judicial Remedies in the European Union are classics and have run into numerous editions. Schermers was a prolific writer of case-books and articles. Through his writing and teaching he influenced the development of his subjects.

Schermers then turned his attention to the emerging law of the European Economic Community and published widely in this field. He became Director of the Europa Instituut at the University of Leiden and Executive Editor of the Common Market Law Review, the leading English-language journal in its field. He also hosted the annual London-Leiden meetings, a closed invitation-only annual meeting which proved a fertile forum for discussing and developing the law of the European Communities. The 2007 London-Leiden meeting was dedicated to his memory. Apart from his books, he wrote numerous articles and case-notes.

Schermers was appointed a member of the European Commission for Human Rights and developed what might be described as his third career (carried out in parallel with his other two), developing into one of the leading practitioners and scholars of European Human Rights law. Again he wrote prolifically in this area.

Having retired from his Chair in Leiden, Schermers was appointed to a special Chair in order to continue his link with the University. His final farewell lecture was attended by the leaders of Dutch academia and policy-makers, many of whom had been his colleagues or students.

Schermers was a scholar of genuine intellectual independence: at the time when all leading Dutch international law scholars without exception signed a document urging sanctions against South Africa and suggested that they were indeed required under public international law, he was the lone dissenter (on purely technical grounds) and in a highly controversial move, made his views public. His views were attacked, but his intellectual honesty was respected.

== Awards and honours ==
In 1990 Schermers was elected a Corresponding Fellow of the British Academy. Schermers received honorary degrees, decorations from The Netherlands and Belgium, and countless academic honours. He was the subject of a massive three-volume Festschrift.

== Later years ==
In 2003 the Schermers chair at Leiden University was founded. It was financed by Schermers himself, who sold his townhouse at the Herengracht in Leiden and donated half a million euro to the university.

In his final years he suffered from cancer. Schermers died on 31 August 2006, aged 77.

== Works cited ==
- Blokker, Niels M. (2006). "Professor Henry G. Schermers (1928-2006)". International Organizations Law Review. 3 (2): 185–187. doi:10.1163/157237406780331625.
- Bomhoff, Jacco; Doeswijk, Nicole (2002). "Twintigduizend dagen recht. Een gesprek met professor mr. H.G. Schermers". Ars Aequi. 51 (6): 392–399.
- Byberg, Rebekka (2017). "The History of Common Market Law Review 1963–1993: Carving out an Academic Space for Europe". European Law Journal. 23 (1–2): 45–65. doi:10.1111/eulj.12201.
- Lawson, Rick (2018). "Mr. P.J.G. Kapteyn". Rechtsgeleerd Magazijn Themis. 179 (3): 104–114.
- Lawson, Rick; de Blois, Matthijs, eds. (1994). "Biography of Henry G. Schermers". The Dynamics of the Protection of Human Rights in Europe. Essays in Honour of Henry G. Schermers. Volume III. The Hague: Martinus Nijhoff. pp. 383–386. ISBN 978-07-92-33161-2.
- Klabbers, Jan (2020). "Schermers' Dilemma" (PDF). European Journal of International Law. 31 (2): 565–582. doi:10.1093/ejil/chaa031.
- Schermers, Henry G. (1978). "The Communities under the European Convention on Human Rights". Legal Issues of Economic Integration. 5 (1): 1–8. doi:10.54648/leie1978001.
- Schermers, Henry G. (2004). "The Birth and Development of International Institutional Law". International Organizations Law Review. 1 (1): 5–8. doi:10.1163/1572374043242394.
- Vandenbosch, Amry (1959). "Review: The Specialized Agencies: Their Structure and Organization. by H. G. Schermers". American Journal of International Law. 53 (3): 723–724. doi:10.2307/2195425.
