= Paul-Peter Tak =

Immunologist and academic

Paul Peter Tak FMedSci
- Education: Vrije Universiteit Amsterdam; Leiden University
- Scientific career
- Fields: Immunology, gene therapy, bioelectronics
- Workplaces: Candel Therapeutics; Kintai Therapeutics; GlaxoSmithKline

Paul-Peter Tak is a Dutch immunologist and academic specialising in the fields of internal medicine, rheumatology and immunology. Tak has been the President & CEO of Candel Therapeutics since September 2020.

== Life and career ==
Tak graduated with a medical degree cum laude from the Amsterdam University Medical Centers and began his medical career as a practitioner in the Bronovo Hospital, The Hague. He joined Leiden University Medical Centre as a Fellow in Internal Medicine in 1990 and was awarded a Fellowship in Rheumatology in 1995. Tak received his PhD from Leiden University in 1996 for his thesis Immunohistologic studies of rheumatoid synovial tissue. He worked as a Clinical Associate Professor of Medicine at the University of California, San Diego, and next was Professor of Medicine and Chair of the Department of Clinical Immunology & Rheumatology at Amsterdam UMC.

Tak has studied the role of the vagus nerve in chronic inflammation, work which provided the basis for clinical trials exploring bioelectronics as a novel therapeutic approach in rheumatoid arthritis patients. He is also known for his studies on synovial biopsy and synovial tissue analysis. In his academic life, Tak has been Visiting Professor, William Harvey Research Institute (London), Honorary Senior Visiting Fellow (University of Cambridge), Honorary Professor of Rheumatology (Ghent University) and was elected a Fellow of the Academy of Medical Sciences (U.K.) in 2016.

He was elected by peers as "Best Rheumatologist" in the Netherlands in 2011, and received the Medal of Honour of the Netherlands Society for Rheumatology the same year. He was rated as one of the world’s top 3 doctors in the field of rheumatoid arthritis by Expertscape in 2014.

From 2011 to 2018, Tak worked at GlaxoSmithKline as Senior Vice President, Chief Immunology Officer and Global Development Leader. He was also the Chair of the Scientific Review Board. In 2018, Tak cofounded Sitryx Therapeutics with researchers Houman Ashrafian, Luke O'Neill, Jonathan Powell, Jeff Rathmell, Michael Rosenblum. Tak was appointed as Board Director of Levicept in July 2018. Tak was chief executive at Tempero Pharmaceutical, which was acquired by GlaxoSmithKline, then was Chief Executive Officer at Kintai Therapeutics in 2018. He was also a venture partner at Flagship Pioneering. In September 2020, Tak became president and CEO of Candel Therapeutics and, in July of the following year, led the company to an Initial Public Offering (IPO) on the Nasdaq. In 2021, Tak was named as one of the most inspiring people in life sciences on the PharmaVOICE100 list. Tak was included in The Medicine Maker Power List 2023 as one of the top ten leaders in the Biopharmaceuticals category. In March 2023, Tak was appointed Chair of the Board of Directors at Citryll.

== Publications ==
Tak has an h-index of 144 according to Google Scholar. His publications include:

- Aletaha, Daniel; Neogi, Tuhina; Silman, Alan J.; Funovits, Julia; Tak, Paul P.; et al. (September 2010). "2010 Rheumatoid arthritis classification criteria: An American College of Rheumatology/European League Against Rheumatism collaborative initiative". Arthritis & Rheumatism. 62 (9): 2569–2581. doi:10.1002/art.27584. hdl:2027.42/78045. PMID 20872595.
- Tak, Paul-Peter; Firestein, Gary S. (January 2001). "NF-κB: a key role in inflammatory diseases". The Journal of Clinical Investigation. 107 (1): 7–11. doi:10.1172/JCI11830. ISSN 0021-9738. PMC 198552. PMID 11134171.
- Tracey, Daniel; Klareskog, Lars; Sasso, Eric H.; Salfeld, Jochen G.; Tak, Paul P. (1 February 2008). "Tumor necrosis factor antagonist mechanisms of action: A comprehensive review". Pharmacology & Therapeutics. 117 (2): 244–279. doi:10.1016/j.pharmthera.2007.10.001. ISSN 0163-7258. PMID 18155297.
- Okada, Yukinori; Wu, Di; Trynka, Gosia; Raj, Towfique; Tak, Paul P.; et al. (20 February 2014). "Genetics of rheumatoid arthritis contributes to biology and drug discovery". Nature. 506 (7488): 376–381. Bibcode:2014Natur.506..376.. doi:10.1038/nature12873. ISSN 0028-0836. PMC 3944098. PMID 24390342.
- Stahl, Eli A; Raychadhuri, Soumya; Remmers, Elaine F; Xie, Gang; Tak, Paul P. (9 May 2010). "Genome-wide association study meta-analysis identifies seven new rheumatoid arthritis risk loci". Nature Genetics. 42 (6): 508–514. doi:10.1038/ng.582. PMC 4243840. PMID 20453842.
