= Hester Bijl =

Dutch mathematician, professor

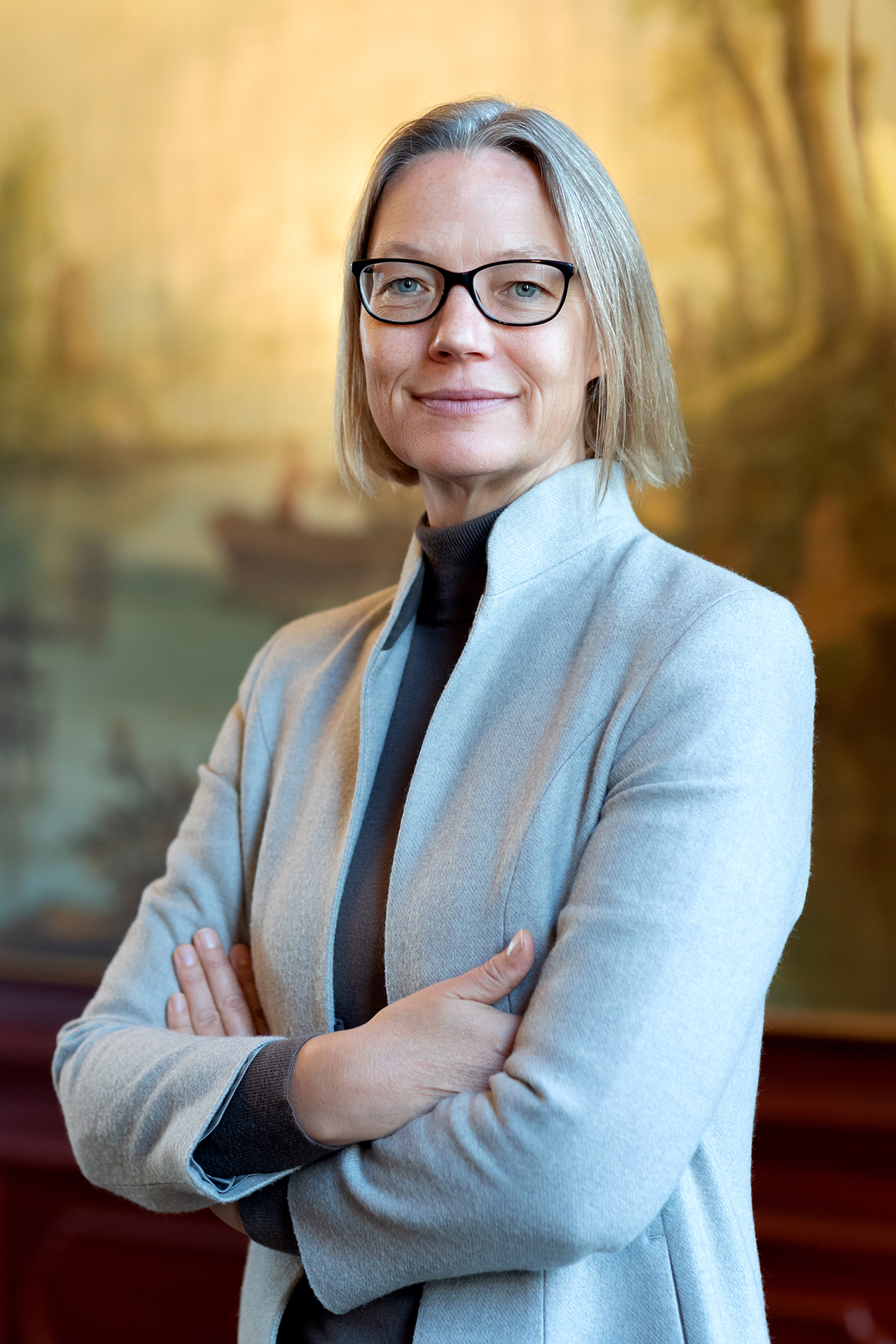

Rector Magnificus of Delft University of Technology
- Preceded by: Tim van der Hagen

Hester Bijl is a Dutch mathematician and since 15 January 2026 the rector magnificus of Delft University of Technology. From 2021 until 2026 she was the rector magnificus of Leiden University.

== Life and career ==
Bijl received a PhD from the Delft University of Technology, along with a master's degree from Leiden University.

In 1999, she started working the Delft University of Technology in the aerodynamics department. In 2013, she became dean of the faculty of aerospace engineering at the Delft University of Technology. In 2021, Bijl was appointed rector magnificus of Leiden University, succeeding Carel Stolker. In 2024, she was reappointed. She is the first female rector of the university.

Bijl is on the supervisory board of the Netherlands Organisation for Applied Scientific Research and on the board of the Leiden Bio Science Park. She has been a visiting researcher at the NASA Langley Research Center.
