= Horst Fischer (lawyer) =

Horst Fischer born 1950 in Duisburg, Germany, is adjunct professor at SIPA/Columbia University in New York and Professor emeritus at Leiden University, Netherlands.

== Biography ==
After studying law Fischer, earned his PhD in 1984 from the University of Bochum with a thesis on international law and the use of nuclear weapons. From 1990, he served as member of several diplomatic delegations to international conferences and meetings that dealt with international humanitarian law and humanitarian affairs. He was adviser for the United Nations, the European Union, several national ministries and various organizations such as the International Committee of the Red Cross (ICRC). He co-founded in 1988 the Institute for International Law of Peace and Armed Conflict at the Ruhr - University Bochum (IFHV) serving as Academic Director for 28 years. Fischer was professor and hold the chair of International Humanitarian Law at Leiden University in the Netherlands until 2019. He also held regular teaching positions at the Universities of Strasbourg (France), Leuven (Belgium), Vesalius College (Brussels), UNB-Brasilia (Brazil). He served as legal counsel for both the Netherlands Red Cross Society and the German Red Cross, for which he also acted as Federal Commissioner and Board member.

== Accomplishments ==
He established the field of humanitarian assistance as relevant interdisciplinary European research and teaching areas in Germany and Europe by the NOHA and E.MA networks. Fischer created at Ruhr-University Bochum in Germany the award-winning NOHA joint degree Master programme]\ in 1994 and E.MA Master in 1997. The programs provided for the first time interdisciplinary joint degrees with transeuropean networks of universities and action oriented focus.

Fischer established in 1998 the Yearbook of International Humanitarian Law as General Editor with Cambridge University Press and the quarterly journal Humanitäres Völkerrecht with the German Red Cross. He had been one of the five rapporteurs for preparing the groundwork from 1995 - 2000 for the study on customary humanitarian law published with Cambridge University Press. He also established in 1989 the Bochumer Blue Books ('Bochumer Schriften zur Friedenssicherung und zum Humanitären Völkerrecht') as a series of monographs and edited book collections dealing with topical issues in the international law of peace and armed conflict. He is editing the Studies on Effective Multilateralism for Sustainable Development with LiT Publishers.

The German Rectors Conference gave him 1999 a special award for establishing European Master Programmes in international humanitarian affairs. The President of the Federal Republic of Germany, Horst Köhler, awarded the Federal Cross of Merit 1st Class of the Order of Merit of the Federal Republic of Germany to Horst Fischer on March 17, 2010 for achievements in humanitarian affairs and the internationalisation of master programmes. The City of Venice, Italy, gave him on September 22, 2013 a special award for his contribution to the international human rights culture .

From 2007 to 2016 he had been the director of the Brussels Representation of the Deutsche Gesellschaft für Internationale Zusammenarbeit. He is currently Senior Member of the Leuven Centre for Global Governance Studies and Non-Resident Senior Fellow at the Global Governance Institute, Brussels. From 2002 - 2016 he had been president of the European Inter University Centre for Human Rights and Democratisation in Venice. From 1994 to 2007 he was President and Honorary President of the NOHA Association in Brussels. From 2001 to 2012, he served as Chairman of the Board of the Berghof Foundation for Conflict Research in Berlin . His main academic interests in addition to humanitarian affairs are multilateral cooperation and sustainable development.
