= Sophia Antoniadis =

Greek university teacher (1895–1972)

- Σοφία Αντωνιάδη
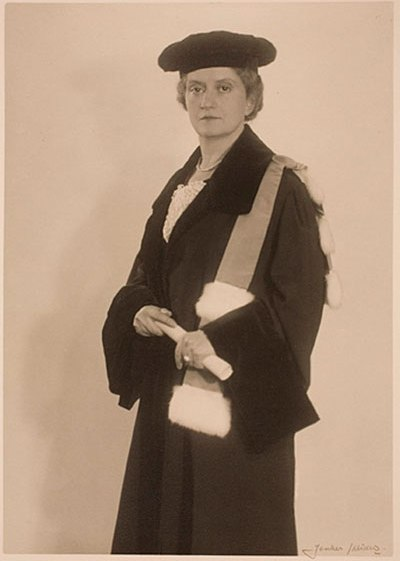
- Born: 31 July 1895; Piraeus, Greece
- Died: 25 January 1972 (aged 76); Athens, Greece

Academic background
- Education: University of Paris
- Thesis: L'Evangile de Luc. Esquisse de Grammaire et de Style (1930)
- Doctoral advisor: Hubert Pernot

Academic work
- Discipline: Byzantine studies
- Institutions: Leiden University, University of Amsterdam
- Notable students: Juliana of the Netherlands

Sophia Antoniadis (Greek: Σοφία Αντωνιάδη; 31 July 1895 – 25 January 1972) was a Greek Byzantinist. She was the first female professor at the Leiden University, the first female Humanities professor in the Netherlands and during her career was one of the few Greek women to hold a position at a European university.

== Early life ==
Antoniadis was born on 31 July 1895 in Piraeus. Her family was originally from Crete, descending from the Byzantine family of Melissinos. Her father, Andreas Antoniadis, was a lawyer in Piraeus; while her mother, Efrosini Leli, belonged to a well-known family from Athens. She completed her basic education by attending classes at the Greek-French School of Aikaterini Diamantopoulou. The outbreak of the First World War delayed her studies, but eventually she went to Paris to study Greek and French literature at the Sorbonne. She graduated with a degree in Classics in 1920.

== Career ==
Antoniadis returned to Greece and in 1922, published her first work The Sacrifice of Abraham. From 1924–26 she lectured on Modern Greek literaturef at the Vocational School of Theatre.

In 1929 she was appointed as Chair in Early Christian, Byzantine and Modern Greek Language and Literature at Leiden University, succeeding Dirk Christiaan Hesseling. On 13 November she gave her acceptance speech to a crowded hall; present were the Greek Consul to Rotterdam, as well as the heir to the Dutch throne, Princess Juliana, who enrolled in Antoniadis' classes.

Under the supervision of Hubert Pernot, she was awarded a PhD in 1930 from the University of Paris-Sorbonne, with the thesis: L 'Ėvangile de Luc. Esquisse de grammaire et de style - an examination the Gospel of Luke. She also published a supplementary dissertation on Pascal as a translator of the Bible.

In 1935 she was elected to a part-time professorship in Early Christian, Medieval and Modern Greek Language at the University of Leiden, replacing the Dutch Byzantine scholar N K Hesseling. In 1951 she became a full professor at the same chair, making her Leiden University's first female professor.

During the Second World War, Antoniadis returned to Greece. During the war she was a member of the Resistance and her house on Xenofontos Street in Syntagma became one of their meeting places.

In 1946 she advertised her availability for teaching in the News Bulletin of the Institute of International Education.

In 1948 she was elected at the University of Amsterdam in the Chair of Modern Greek Language and Literature. In 1955 she became Director at the Hellenic Institute of Byzantine and Post-Byzantine Studies in Venice. During her time in Venice she contributed to the renovation of buildings such as the Flanginian School and San Giorgio dei Greci, where she founded a museum. She remained until 1966, when she retired to Athens.

Antoniadis died on 25 January 1972 in Athens.

== Research ==
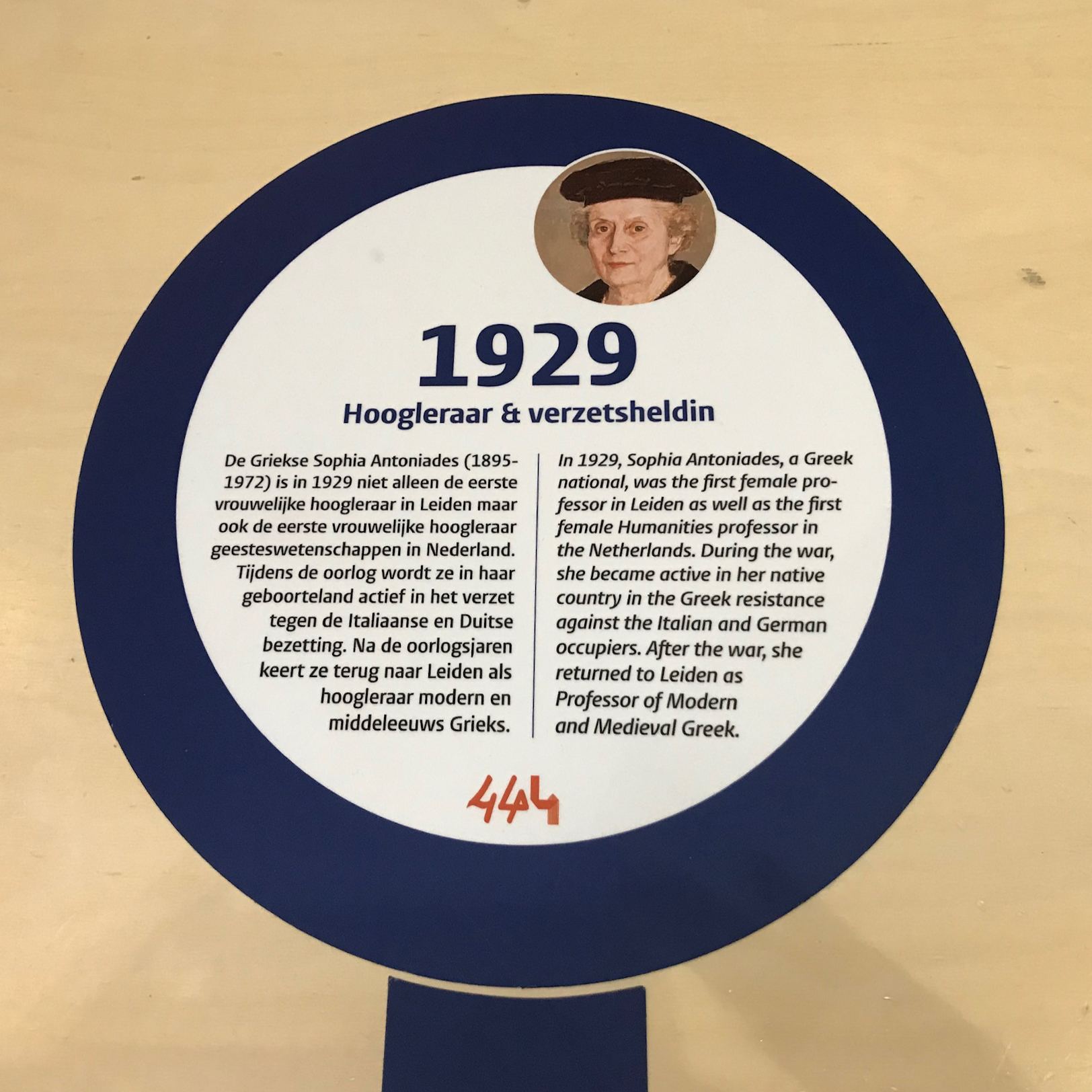
Sign at Leiden University

Antoniadis' research explored the connections between Greek literature in the ancient, Byzantine and modern periods, with a particular focus on the place of liturgy. She also published a textbook in Dutch on how to learn the Greek language. Her 1939 volume on the place of liturgy in the tradition of Greek letter-writing was an important work, which proved that Orthodox liturgy had its roots in classical and post-classical literature. Her work included studies of Pascal's Bible translation, the Ptochoprodromika by the 12th-century Byzantine writer Theodoros Prodromos, as well as on Erotokritos and the Sacrifice of Abraham by an unknown Venetian-Cretan poet of the 15th century. She was seen as a thorough and meticulous scholar.

=== Selected publications ===
- Place de la liturgie dans la tradition de lettres grecques (Leiden, 1939)
- De l'influence de la langue du droit byzantin sur le grec d'aujourd'hui (Brussels, 1932)

=== Honours ===
In 1950 she was honoured with the Gold Cross of the Order of Beneficence and the Order of the Phoenix, while the Academy of Athens elected her a corresponding member. When she left the University of Leiden, her colleagues and students dedicated an honorary volume to her entitled Antidoron.

=== Legacy ===
For many years Antoniadis' portrait was the only one of a woman to hang in the Senate Chamber at Leiden University, however in 2018, to celebrate International Women's Day, her portrait was joined by 14 others for the first time. There were 117 male portraits on display still.
