= Miep Stegmann =

Belgian psychiatrist

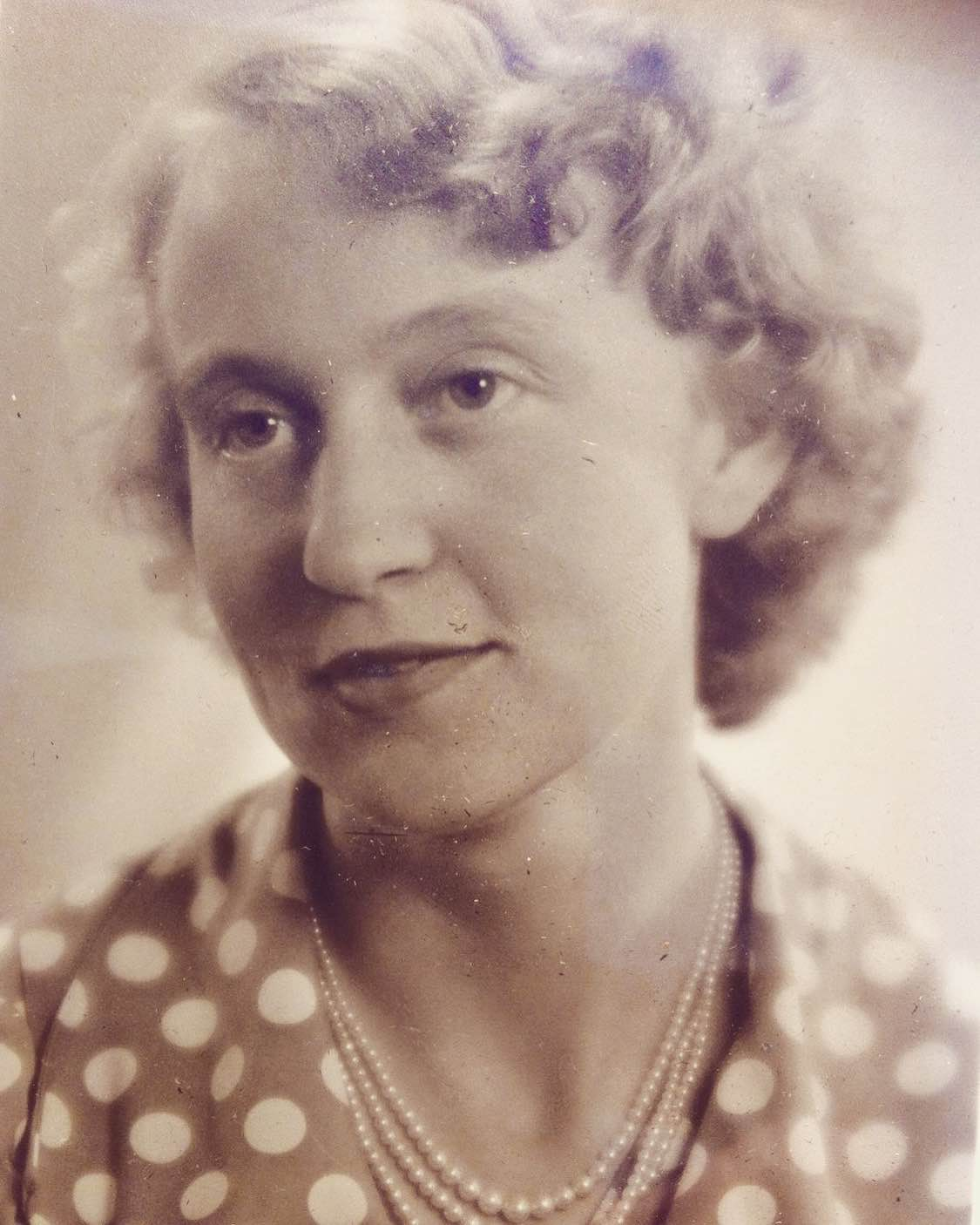

Miep Stegmann (1927, Schiedam – 1985, Sint-Truiden) was the first female psychiatrist in Belgium. Stegmann grew up in the Netherlands. Her father owned a copper smith firm Meijer & Stegmann in Schiedam.

David Meijer started the copper smith factory in 1830 and merged with Stegmann in 1898.

Stegmann obtained her education in medicine and psychiatry at Leiden University.

At the time she was a psychiatrist, not many doctors were skilled in psychoanalysis. It was since the upcoming of the groundbreaking neurologist Sigmund Freud, that psychoanalysis became to play a significant role in psychiatry. Stegmann was a pioneer of her time and one of the adepts of Freud's ideas.

== Personal life ==
In Belgium Stegmann married neurologist Dr. A. Malfait.
