= Timeline of Nijmegen =

The following is a timeline of the history of the municipality of Nijmegen, Netherlands.

== Prior to 20th century ==
- 800 - Fort built (approximate date).
- 1030 - Sint-Nicolaaskapel (church) built (approx. date).
- 1272 - Saint Stephen's Church, Nijmegen built (approx. date).
- 1390 - Public clock installed (approximate date).
- 1479 - Printing press in operation.
- 1526 - Stratemakerstoren bastion built (approximate date).
- 1554 - Town Hall built.
- 1589 - 10 August: Assault on Nijmegen.
- 1591
  - July: Siege of Knodsenburg.
  - October: Siege of Nijmegen.
- 1612 - Boterwaag (Nijmegen) (weigh house) built (approximate date).
- 1618 - Collector of Roman antiquities Johannes Smetius moves to Nijmegen.
- 1646 - Belvédère (Nijmegen) (tower) built.
- 1656 - University of Nijmegen established.
- 1678 - European peace treaty signed in Nijmegen.
- 1679 - University of Nijmegen closed.
- 1756 - Nijmegen Synagogue consecrated in Benedenstad (Nijmegen).
- 1788 - Henriette Pressburg, mother of Karl Marx born.
- 1794 - French bombardment of the Valkhof palace.
- 1824 - Nijmegen arsenal built.
- 1839 - Theatre built.
- 1848 - De Gelderlander newspaper begins publication.
- 1865 - Nijmegen railway station opens.
- 1866 - Population: 22,551.
- 1879
  - Arnhem–Nijmegen railway begins operating.
  - Nijmegen railway bridge built.
- 1881 - Tilburg–Nijmegen railway begins operating.
- 1883
  - Nijmegen–Venlo railway begins operating.
  - Kolpinghuis built.
- 1884 - Old city wall dismantled.
- 1885 - Hunnerpark laid out.

== 20th century ==
- 1904 - Population: 49,342.
- 1911 - Gemeentetram Nijmegen (tram) begins operating.
- 1915 - Concertgebouw de Vereeniging (concert hall) opens.
- 1916 - Openbare Bibliotheek Nijmegen (library) established.
- 1919 - Population: 66,833.
- 1923
  - Catholic University of Nijmegen established.
  - Saint Stephen's Church, Nijmegen (1927) built.
- 1925 - Becomes centre for annual Vierdaagse walk.
- 1928 - Jesuit Collegium Berchmanianum established.
- 1936 - Waalbrug (road bridge) opens.
- 1939 - Stadion de Goffert (stadium) opens.
- 1940 - First Dutch city to be occupied by Germany.
- 1944
  - 22 February: Bombing of Nijmegen.
  - September: as part of the Allied Operation Market Garden, the Battle of Nijmegen takes place.
  - October: Battle of the Nijmegen salient
  - October: Charles Hustinx becomes mayor.
- 1948 - De Vasim factory built.
- 1951 - Dominicuskerk (Nijmegen) (church) built.
- 1952 - Nijmegen trolleybus begins operating.
- 1955 - Bioscoop Carolus (cinema) opens.
- 1956 - University Hospital established.
- 1960 - St Peter Canisius Church rebuilt on Molenstraat (Nijmegen).
- 1961 - Nijmegen City Theatre opens.
- 1966 - Development of Dukenburg and Lindenholt areas begins.
- 1970 - Vierdaagsefeesten (festival) begins.
- 1972
  - Lidenberg Nijmegen Culture House cultural centre established.
  - Passage Molenpoort shopping mall built.
- 1974
  - Canisius-Wilhelmina Ziekenhuis (hospital) opens.
  - Passage Mariënburg shopping mall and University's Erasmusgebouw built.
- 1979 - University's Nijmeegs Volkenkundig Museum opens.
- 1980 - Rijksbeschermd gezicht Nijmegen (historic district) designated.
- 1981 - Velorama bicycle museum founded.
- 1982 - Steigertheater established.
- 1984
  - Stichting Nijmegen Blijft in Beeld te Nijmegen (film society) founded.
  - De Grote Broek squat occupied.
- 1988 - Badhuis (Nijmegen) Theatre opens.
- 1991 - Extrapool cultural organization established.
- 1994 - de-Affaire music fest begins.
- 1995 - Population: 147,561.
- 1996 - HAN University of Applied Sciences established.
- 1999
  - Valkhof Museum established.
  - Wintertuin Festival begins.
- 2000 - Population: 152,286.

== 21st century ==
- 2001 - The Matrixx nightclub opens.
- 2004
  - LUX (Nijmegen) cinema opens.
  - Radboud University Nijmegen active.
- 2005 - 15 November: Journalist Sévèke killed in Nijmegen.
- 2007 - FiftyTwoDegrees hi-rise building constructed.
- 2010 - Waalfront area development begins.
- 2012 - Hubert Bruls becomes mayor.
- 2013
  - "Ik bouw betaalbaar" self-build housing program active (approximate date).
  - Oversteek bridge and S100 (Nijmegen) access road open.
- 2014 - Nijmegen Goffert railway station opened.
- 2015 - Population: 170,774.

== See also ==
- Nijmegen history
- History of Nijmegen
- List of mayors of Nijmegen
- List of heritage sites in Nijmegen
- List of rijksmonuments in Nijmegen
- Other names of Nijmegen e.g. Nijmwegen, Nimègue, Nimeguen, Nimmegen, Nimwege, Nimwegen, Nymegen, Nymwegen
- Timelines of other municipalities in the Netherlands: Amsterdam, Breda, Delft, Eindhoven, Groningen, Haarlem, The Hague, 's-Hertogenbosch, Leiden, Maastricht, Rotterdam, Utrecht
- History of urban centers in the Low Countries

== Bibliography ==
in English

- Thomas Nugent (1749), "Nimeguen", The Grand Tour, vol. 1: Netherlands, London: S. Birt, hdl:2027/mdp.39015030762598
- Abraham Rees (1819), "Nimeguen", The Cyclopaedia, London: Longman, Hurst, Rees, Orme & Brown, hdl:2027/mdp.39015068382335
- William Henry Overall, ed. (1870). "Nimeguen, Holland". Dictionary of Chronology. London: William Tegg. hdl:2027/uc2.ark:/13960/t9m32q949.
- "Nijmegen", Handbook for Travellers in Holland and Belgium (20th ed.), London: John Murray, 1881, hdl:2027/hvd.hn2ha2
- "Nimeguen". Chambers's Encyclopaedia. London. 1901. hdl:2027/uc2.ark:/13960/t3bz6g65j.
- "Nymwegen", Belgium and Holland (15th ed.), Leipzig: Karl Baedeker, 1910, hdl:2027/uc1.b3129294
- "Nijmwegen" . Encyclopædia Britannica. Vol. 19 (11th ed.). 1910. p. 689.
- Benjamin Vincent (1910), "Nimeguen, Holland", Haydn's Dictionary of Dates (25th ed.), London: Ward, Lock & Co., hdl:2027/uc2.ark:/13960/t41r6xh8t
- Trudy Ring, ed. (1995). "Nijmegen". Northern Europe. International Dictionary of Historic Places. Fitzroy Dearborn. p. 533+. ISBN 978-1-136-63944-9.

in Dutch

- H.D.J. Van Schevichaven (1906). Repertorium noviomagense: proeve van een register van boekwerken en geschriften betrekking hebbende op de stad en het Rijk van Nijmegen (in Dutch). Nijmegen: F.E. Macdonald. (bibliography)
- G. van Herwijnen, ed. (1978). "Gelderland: Nijmegen". Bibliografie van de stedengeschiedenis van Nederland [Bibliography of Urban History in the Netherlands] (in Dutch). Brill. ISBN 90-04-05700-5.
