= Roger Ariew =

American philosopher

Education
- Education: University of Illinois (PhD)

Philosophical work
- Era: 21st-century philosophy
- Region: Western philosophy
- Institutions: University of South Florida
- Main interests: Cartesian philosophy

Roger Ariew is an American philosopher and Distinguished University Professor of Philosophy at the University of South Florida. He is known for his works on Cartesian philosophy. He received a BA, MA, and PhD in philosophy from the University of Illinois Urbana-Champaign.

== Books ==
- Descartes and the First Cartesians (Oxford University Press, 2014)
- Descartes and the Last Scholastics (Cornell University Press, 1999); second, expanded edition, Descartes among the Scholastics (Brill Academic, 2011)
- Historical Dictionary of Descartes and Cartesian Philosophy, with Dennis Des Chene, Douglas Jesseph, Tad Schmaltz, and Theo Verbeek, (2nd edition, Rowman and Littlefield, 2015)
