= Jean Banières =

French physicist and philosopher

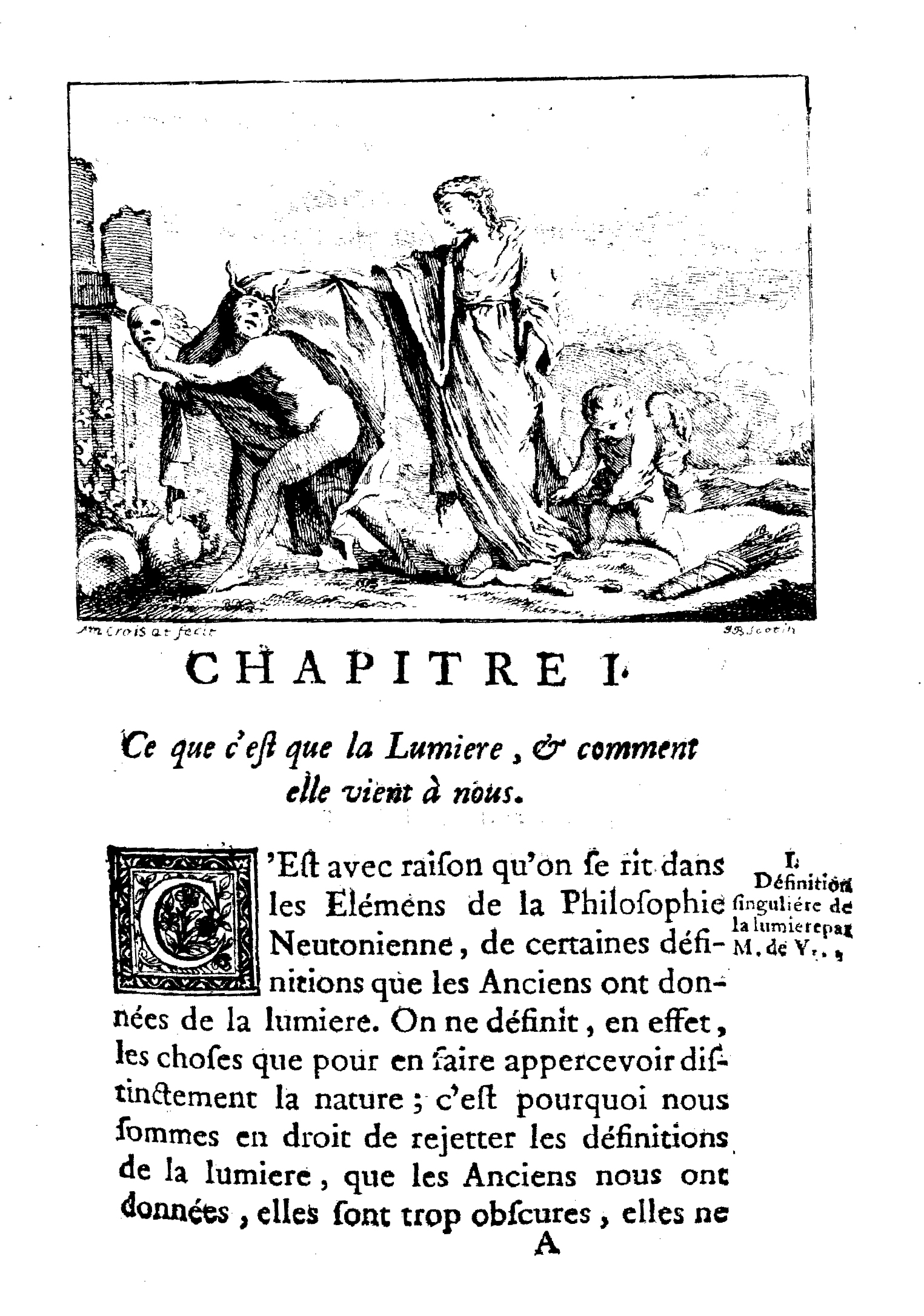
Chapter I of Examen et réfutation des Elemens de la philosophie de Neuton de M. De Voltaire (1739)

Jean Banières was an 18th-century French physicist and philosopher.

A zealous Cartesian, he was sceptical about Voltaire's Newtonian theories on light and colours.

== Works ==
- Traité phisique, de la lumiere et des couleurs, du son et des différens tons (in French). Paris: Mazieres & J. B. Garnier. 1737.
- Examen et réfutation des Elemens de la philosophie de Neuton de M. De Voltaire (in French). Paris: Jacques Lambert. 1739.
