= Johannes Smetius =

Dutch minister, collector and archaeologist

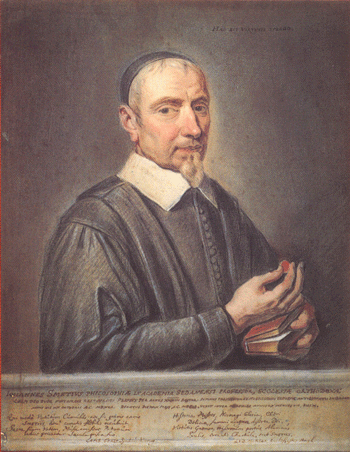
- Portrait of Smetius by Rutger von Langerfeld, 1669
- Born: 10 October 1590; Aachen
- Died: 30 May 1651 (aged 60); Nijmegen
- Occupations: Minister, archaeologist
- Known for: Smetius Collection

Johannes Smith of Kettenis (10 October 1590 - 30 May 1651), known as Johannes Smetius, was a Dutch minister, collector and archaeologist, particularly known for his collection of Roman antiquities and his studies of the Roman past in the city of Nijmegen.

== Biography ==
Smetius was born in Aachen to Johann Smith of Kettenis, a textile merchant, and Mary Raets of Karken. In 1605, he began his studies with Johannes Pontanus, professor of physics and mathematics at the University of Harderwijk. He returned to Aachen in 1612 and found work as a Protestant minister. Following the Siege of Aachen, he left to study at the Academy of Sedan. He assumed the position as a lecturer of philosophy in 1615. He declined an appointment to the Academy of Saumur, preferring to follow his parents to Nijmegen in 1617. He began to preach at Saint Stephen's Church.

Smetius developed a fascination with Roman artifacts. Much of his spare time and money was spent collecting and studying Roman archaeology in and around the city. He also cultivated a passion for Latin poetry.

During the 1620s, the excavation of tuff foundations around Nijmegen revealed many Roman era antiques. This abundance of Roman finds enabled Smetius to lay an important foundation for his archaeological collection, known thereafter as the Smetius Collection. The residents of Nijmegen knew of his interest in antique objects and offered him finds found during excavations and construction work. His collection grew to contain 10,000 Roman coins, thousands of which had been previously undocumented, and around 4,500 miscellaneous artifacts. Smetius opened his collection for public viewing, attracting many distinguished visitors such as Johannes Gronovius, Nicolaas Heinsius, Constantijn Huygen, Franciscus Junius, Johannes Pontanus, and Claudius Salmasius.

Smetius' hobby of collecting antiquities was not unique at this time. It was quite common among the wealthy citizens of the Dutch Republic to build a private collection of Roman antiquities out of hobby or learned interest. Such a collection served as a status object for many people, but Smetius built his collection out of pure scientific interest. He selected not so much on the basis of rarity or beauty, but on the basis of historical value for the city of Nijmegen. Partly for this reason, Smetius is often seen as a pioneer in scientific archaeology in Nijmegen.

With Lambert Goris, Smetius started the Illustere school, which was a precursor to the old University of Nijmegen.

On 30 May 1651 Smetius became unwell during his sermons and died later that day. He was buried with his parents at Saint Stephen's Church, where he had been active as a minister since 1618. Lambert Goris was the orator at his funeral.

== Legacy ==
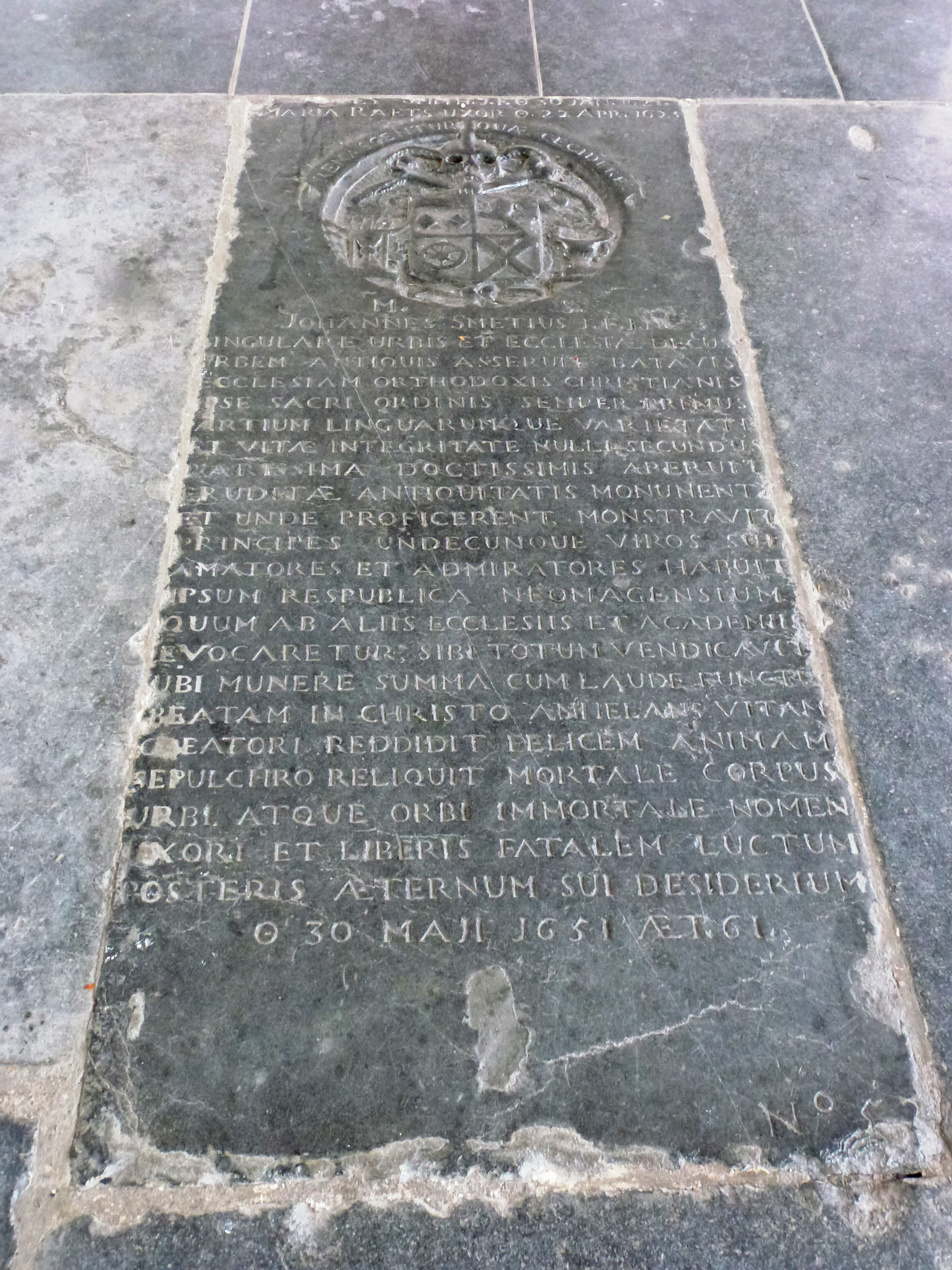
Tomb of Johannes Smetius and his parents at the Saint Stephen's Church, Nijmegen

After his death, his collection, apart from a number of pieces that were donated to the city of Nijmegen, was purchased by Johann Wilhelm and relocated to Düsseldorf. The collection was slowly dismantled, and it is no longer possible to find the original pieces.

Smetius was survived by a son, Johannes Smetius (1630 - 1710). The Smetiusstraat in downtown Nijmegen was named after him.

== Select publications ==
- Oppidum Batavorum seu Noviomagum liber singularis, published in 1644, contains research on the origin of the Batavians. The opinion of Cluwer and other geographers was that the city of Batavodurum cited by Tacitus (Hist. V, 19) was Batenborch, a fortress located near the right bank of the Meuse, one league below Ravejleyn. Smetius argued that this city is Nijmegen.
- Thesaurus antiquarius seu Smetianus, sive notitia elegantissimæ supellectilis Romanæ et rarissimæ Pinacothecæ, etc., published in 1658, contains the description of his collection. It was reprinted with additions by his son in 1678, under the title of Antiquitates Noviomagenses, sive notitia rarissimarum rerum antiquarum quas in veteri Batavorum oppido comparaverunt J. Smetius pater et filius.
