= Yvo Gaukes =

German physician

Yvo Gaukes (Latin: Yvonis; also Yves, Ivo) (c. 1660–1738) was a prominent physician who practised at Emden and can be counted among the iatromathematicians of his time. In his best-known theoretical publication, Dissertatio de medicina ad certitudinem mathematicam evehenda (1712) he developed a medical theory on the grounds of Cartesianism, proposing sizes and shapes for the main components of the Four Humors based on these largely philosophical considerations. Gaukes also popularized Species Lignorum, a variant of the numerous Guaiacum wood extracts that had been used to treat syphilis since the late 16th century.

Most of Gaukes' works in clinical medicine, which were largely published in Groningen and Amsterdam, are limited to case reports.

== Works by Yvo Gaukes ==
- Disputatio medica inauguralis de epilepsia (1695)
- Yvonis Gaukes (1700). Praxis chirurgico-medica, experimentis propriis, iisque infinitis, viginti sex annorum spatio, et quod excurrit, magno negotio collecta in qua morborum qui, ob vitia succorum sanguinem antecedentium et ipsius quoque sanguinis contingunt, causae, phaenomena atque curationes... describuntur
- Praxis medico-chirurgica rationalis, seu observationes medico-chirurgicae, ratiociniis philosophicis illustratae. Eikas prima, continens affectus e faecibus alvinis pituita intestinali, ac sanguine male constitutis oriundos (1700)
- Dissertatio de medicina ad certitudinem mathematicam evehenda: continens certa hujus artis principia, & quomodo ex iis omnia mechanice, & methodo mathematica demonstrari possint. In eä quoque habentur diversa, cum aliorum, tum maxime Cartesii & Newtoni de rebus philosophicis sententiae sic, ut justo cuilibet veritatis arbitro apparere queat, uter ex his viris acutissimis felicius rem actu tetigerit (1712)
