= Antoine Le Grand =

French Recollect and Cartesian philosopher

- Born: 1629; Douai, Spanish Netherlands
- Died: 7 August 1699 (aged 69–70); London, England

Antoine Le Grand (French: [ɑ̃twan lə ɡʁɑ̃]; 1629 – 7 August 1699) was a French Recollect and Cartesian philosopher.

== Life ==
Born in Douai, Spanish Netherlands, he was attached at an early age to the English community of St. Bonaventure's convent there, and became a Franciscan Recollect friar, and taught philosophy and divinity. Sent on the English mission, he resided for many years in Oxfordshire, and in 1695 he was tutor in the family of Henry Fermor of Tusmore. His advocacy of Cartesianism met with strong resistance from Samuel Parker, who would become bishop of Oxford. Towards the close of his life, he engaged in sharp controversies on metaphysical topics with John Sergeant, a secular priest. At the twenty-third chapter of his order, assembled in London on 9 July 1693, he was elected provincial, and he held that office till his death on 9 August 1699.

Le Grand argued against animal rights and authored Dissertatio de carentia sensus et cognitionis in brutis (On the Lack of Sense and Cognition in Brutes) in 1675 which defends the Cartesian idea that animals are mere machines.

Le Grand authored An Entire Body of Philosophy in 1694 which reduced Cartesianism to a "scholastic" scheme. It has been described as the last major exposition of Cartesianism which heralded the close of the Cartesian era. He lived a studious and retired life. He is noted for the effort he made to render the approach of Descartes more apparently scholastic, to improve its reception with traditionalists.

== Works ==
His works are:

- Le Sage des Stoiques, ou l'Homme sans Passions. Selon les sentimens de Sénèque, the Hague, 1662; Lyons, 1666. dedicated to Charles II. This work was reproduced anonymously, under the title of Les Caratères de l'Homme sans Passions, selon les Sentiments de Sénèque, Paris. 1663, 1682; Lyons, 1665. An English translation by G. R, appeared at London, 1676.
- Physica, Amsterdam, 1664.
- L'Épicure Spirituel, ou l'Empire de la Volupté sur les Vertus, Paris [1669?]. Rendered in English by Edward Cooke, 1676.
- Philosophia Veterum e mente Renati Descartes, more scholastico breviter digesta, London, 1671. After being expanded by the author, it was republished under the title of Institutio Philosophiae, secundum principia Renati Descartes, nova methodo adornata et explicata ad usum juventutis academico, London, 1672; 3rd edit, 1675; 4th edit., 'auctior,' 1680; Nuremberg, 1695. Wood says this work was much read in the university of Cambridge. An English translation was published by Richard Blome at London in 1694.
- Historia Naturae, variis experimentis et ratiociniis elucidata, London, 1673, 1680; Nuremberg, 1678, 1680, 1702.
- Dissertatio de Carentia Senaûs et Cognitionis in Brutis, London, 1675; Leyden, 1675; Nuremberg, 1679. The authorship of this work has been erroneously ascribed to Henry Jenkins.
- Apologia pro Renato Des-Cartes contra Samuelem Parkerum, London, 1679, 1682; Nuremberg, 1681.
- Curiosus Rerum Abditarum Naturaeq: Arcanorum Perscrutator, Frankfort and Nuremberg, 1681,. A German translation appeared in 1682,
- Animadversiones ad Jacobi Rohaultii Tractatum Physicum, London, 1683. These are remarks on a Latin version, by Théophile Bonnet, of Jacques Rohault's Physique.
- Historia Sacra a mundi exordio ad Constantini Magni imperium deducta, London, 1685.
- Missae Sacrificium neomystis succincte expositum, London, 1695.
- Dissertatio de ratione cognoscendi et appendix de mutatione formali, contra J. S. [John Sergeant] methodum sciendi, London, n.d.
- Historia Hieresiarcharum a Christo nato a usque tempora, Douay, 1729.
