= Cartesianism =

Philosophical and scientific system of René Descartes

Cartesianism is the philosophical and scientific system of René Descartes and its subsequent development by other seventeenth century thinkers, most notably François Poullain de la Barre, Nicolas Malebranche and Baruch Spinoza. Descartes is often regarded as the first thinker to emphasize the use of reason to develop the natural sciences. For him, philosophy was a thinking system that embodied all knowledge.

Aristotle and St. Augustine's work influenced Descartes's cogito argument. Additionally, there is similarity between Descartes's work and that of Scottish philosopher George Campbell's 1776 publication, titled Philosophy of Rhetoric. In his Meditations on First Philosophy he writes, "[b]ut what then am I? A thing which thinks. What is a thing which thinks? It is a thing which doubts, understands, [conceives], affirms, denies, wills, refuses, which also imagines and feels."

Cartesians view the mind as being wholly separate from the corporeal body. Sensation and the perception of reality are thought to be the source of untruth and illusions, with the only reliable truths to be had in the existence of a metaphysical mind. Such a mind can perhaps interact with a physical body, but it does not exist in the body, nor even in the same physical plane as the body. The question of how mind and body interact would be a persistent difficulty for Descartes and his followers, with different Cartesians providing different answers. To this point Descartes wrote, "we should conclude from all this, that those things which we conceive clearly and distinctly as being diverse substances, as we regard mind and body to be, are really substances essentially distinct one from the other; and this is the conclusion of the Sixth Meditation." Therefore, we can see that, while mind and body are indeed separate, because they can be separated from each other, but, Descartes postulates, the mind is a whole, inseparable from itself, while the body can become separated from itself to some extent, as in when one loses an arm or a leg.

== Ontology ==
Descartes held that all existence consists in three distinct substances, each with its own essence:

- matter, possessing extension in three dimensions
- mind, possessing self-conscious thought
- God, possessing necessary existence

== Epistemology ==
Descartes brought the question of how reliable knowledge may be obtained (epistemology) to the fore of philosophical enquiry. Many consider this to be Descartes's most lasting influence on the history of philosophy.

Cartesianism is a form of rationalism because it holds that scientific knowledge can be derived a priori from 'innate ideas' through deductive reasoning. Thus Cartesianism is opposed to both Aristotelianism and empiricism, with their emphasis on sensory experience as the source of all knowledge of the world.

For Descartes, the faculty of deductive reason is supplied by God and may therefore be trusted because God would not deceive us.

== Geographical dispersal ==
In the Netherlands, where Descartes had lived for a long time, Cartesianism was a doctrine popular mainly among university professors and lecturers. In Germany the influence of this doctrine was not relevant and followers of Cartesianism in the German-speaking border regions between these countries (e.g., the iatromathematician Yvo Gaukes from East Frisia) frequently chose to publish their works in the Netherlands. In France, it was very popular, and gained influence also among Jansenists such as Antoine Arnauld, though there also, as in Italy, it became opposed by the Church. In Italy, the doctrine failed to make inroads, probably since Descartes's works were placed on the Index Librorum Prohibitorum in 1663.

In England, because of religious and other reasons, Cartesianism was not widely accepted. Though Henry More was initially attracted to the doctrine, his own changing attitudes toward Descartes mirrored those of the country: "quick acceptance, serious examination with accumulating ambivalence, final rejection".

== Criticism ==
According to the Roman Catholic philosopher Jacques Maritain, Descartes eliminated the distinction between angelic and human minds, as if humans were angels inhabiting machines, a position that Maritain derided as "angelism". In Thomas Aquinas's thought, angels are capable of an instantaneous knowledge that is not mediated by the human senses. (Descartes, for his part, dismissed Aquinas's cogitations on the knowledge of angels as "inept".) Maritain's interpretation is only one of many interpretations of Descartes's view about the relationship of body and soul, and some interpretations portray Descartes as instead, for example, a Scholastic-Aristotelian hylomorphist or even a covert materialist. Étienne Gilson responded to Maritain by saying that if Descartes committed the sin of angelism it was not an "original sin" but had been committed first by Plato, Saint Augustine, Avicenna, and even the Bible. John Crowe Ransom called Maritain's accusation of angelism a "phantasy". According to C. F. Fowler, Descartes explicitly denied an identity between human minds and the angels, but sometimes used language in a way that was vulnerable to the opposite interpretation.

The Australian philosopher Colin Murray Turbayne raised doubts concerning the degree to which Descartes adhered to his own scientific method in the course of expounding upon his Cartesian system. Turbayne notes that Descartes deviated from his professed scientific methodology in at least three different instances. In the first instance, Descartes arbitrarily ascribed the certainty which characterizes the use of deductive reasoning to develop theorems and principles, as a property which is also inherent within the natural world itself in the form of active principles, which serve as catalysts for causal chains of events. As a result of this error, Descartes incorrectly ascribed a property associated with the process of explaining natural events to the natural events themselves. In the second instance, Descartes violated a central tenet of his own methodology by arbitrarily bifurcating the natural world into "causal laws" and "effects" without first providing direct observational evidence of the presence of such causal agents within the natural world. According to Turbayne, Descartes third error is associated with his apriori assumption that every application of his scientific method must utilize mathematical calculation in order to deduce valid conclusions. This incorrectly assumes that the process of deductive reasoning is by its very nature inherently reliant upon the use of mathematical computation for the development of conclusions. In Turbayne's view, this constitutes an arbitrarily restrictive definition of the scientific method which creates needless confusion.

== Notable Cartesians ==
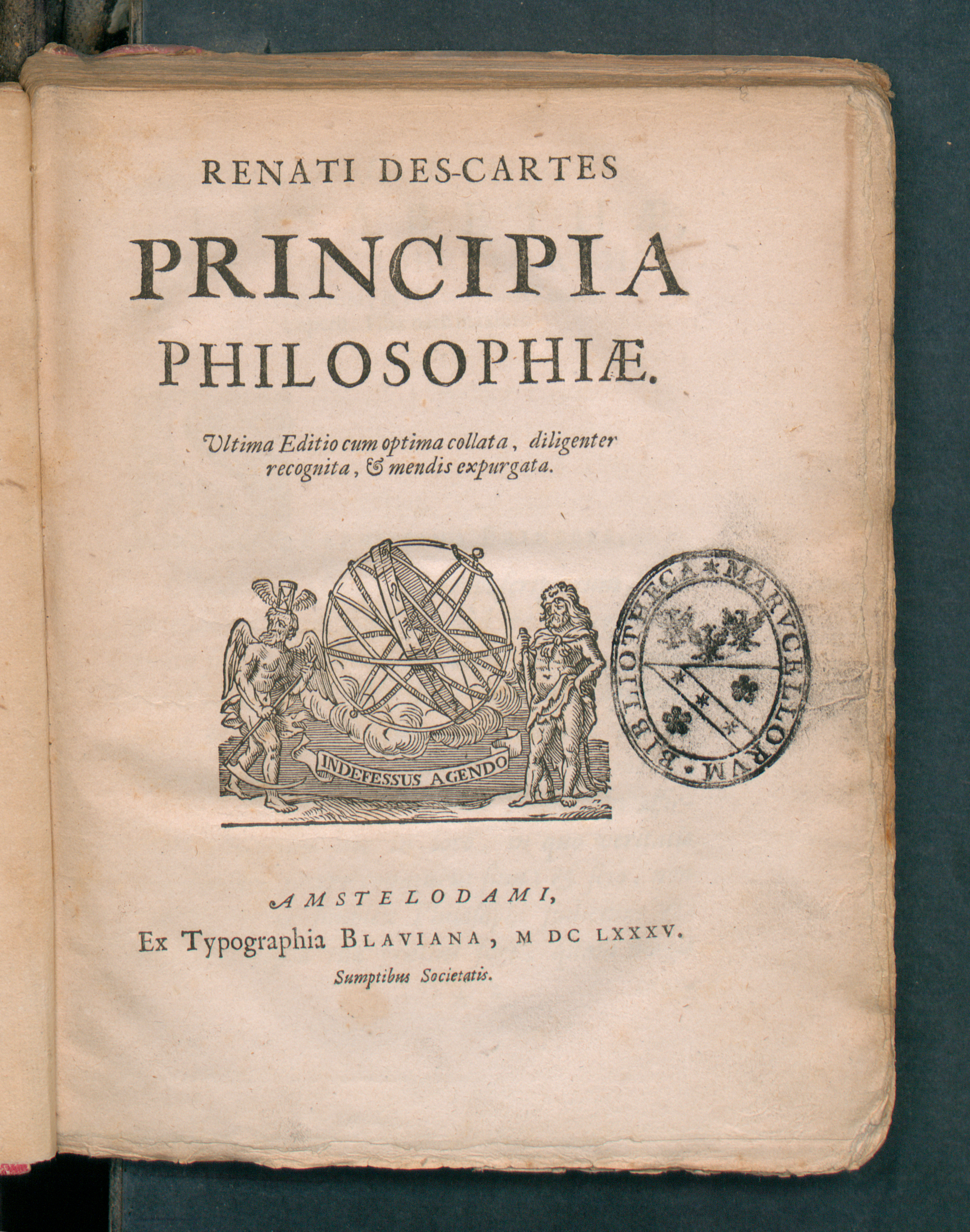
Principia philosophiae, 1685

- Antoine Arnauld
- Balthasar Bekker
- Tommaso Campailla
- Johannes Clauberg
- Michelangelo Fardella
- Antoine Le Grand
- Adriaan Heereboord
- Nicolas Malebranche
- François Poullain de la Barre
- Edmond Pourchot
- Pierre-Sylvain Régis
- Henricus Regius
- Jacques Rohault
- Christopher Wittich

== See also ==
- Cartesian coordinate system
- Mind–body dualism
- Meditations on First Philosophy
- Mentalism (psychology)
- Simulism
- Rationalism

== Bibliography ==
- Francisque Bouillier, Histoire de la philosophie cartésienne (2 volumes) Paris: Durand 1854 (reprint: BiblioBazaar 2010).
- Caird, Edward (1911). "Cartesianism" . In Chisholm, Hugh (ed.). Encyclopædia Britannica. Vol. 5 (11th ed.). Cambridge University Press. pp. 414–426. This contains a long review of the principles of Cartesian philosophy.
- Eduard Jan Dijksterhuis, Descartes et le cartésianisme hollandais. Études et documents Paris: PUF 1951.
- Garrod, Raphaële; Marr, Alexander, eds. (2020). Descartes and the "Ingenium": The Embodied Soul in Cartesianism. Brill's Studies in Intellectual History. Vol. 323. Leiden: Brill Publishers. ISBN 978-90-04-43761-6. ISSN 0920-8607.
- Tad M. Schmaltz (ed.), Receptions of Descartes. Cartesianism and Anti-Cartesianism in Early Modern Europe New York: Routledge 2005.
- Richard A. Watson, The Downfall of Cartesianism 1673–1712. A Study of Epistemological Issues in Late 17th Century Cartesianism The Hague: Martinus Nijhoff 1966.
