= Stratemakerstoren =

Coordinates: 51°50′55″N 5°52′11″E

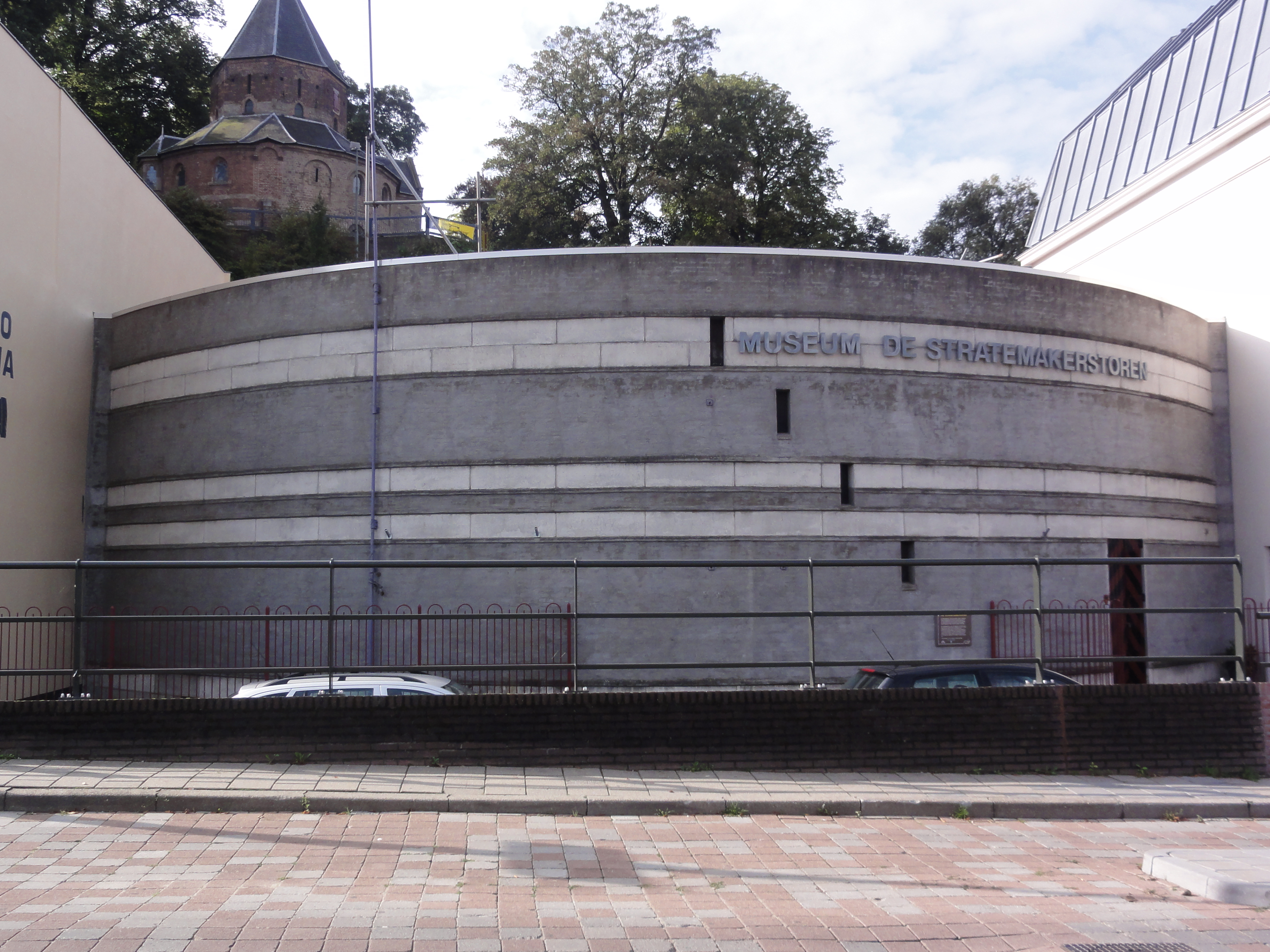
Rijksmonument de Stratemakerstoren

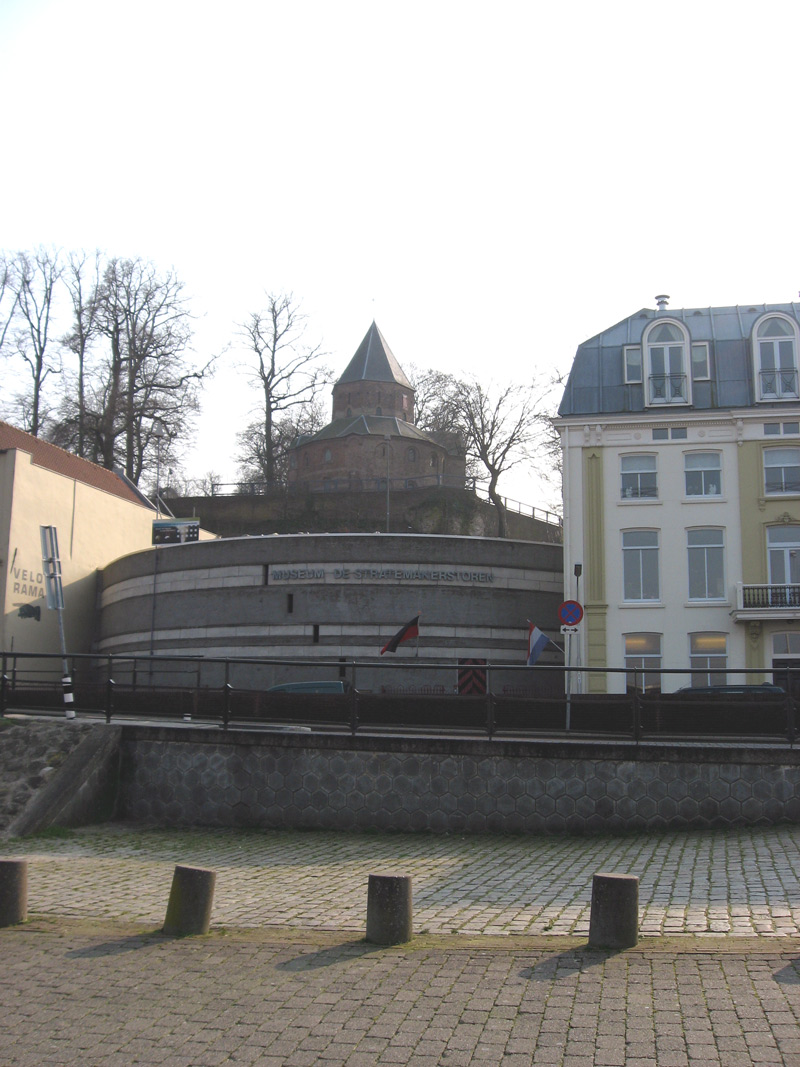
De Stratemakerstoren on the Waalkade

The Stratemakerstoren is an early 16th-century bastion on the Waalkade in the Dutch town Nijmegen. It is a rijksmonument (national heritage site) and since 1995, it housed a museum. This was closed in April 2015, for major reconstruction. The Stratemakerstoren is located on the edge of the river Waal, at the foot of the Valkhof at Nijmegen. This bastion was a part of the fortifications of Nijmegen, built in or before 1526. The current name, which means "Road Workers Tower", was already in use in 1569 - the reason for this name is still not exactly known.

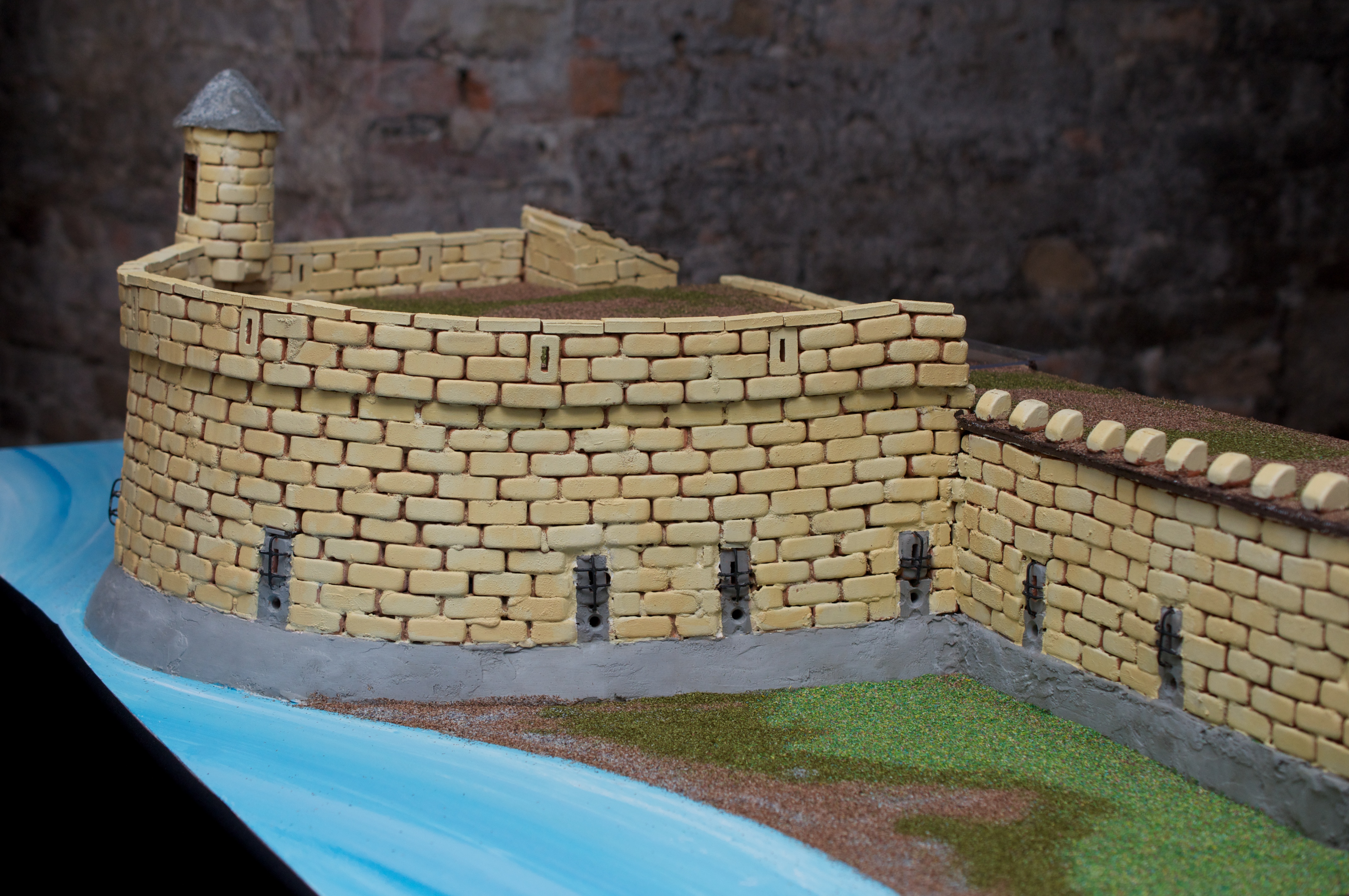
Model of the Stratemakerstoren, built by Bert Eggelaar, photographed by Nico van Hoorn. This model can be seen in the museum

The Stratemakerstoren was constructed to protect the adjacent gate, the Veerpoort. The tower often figures on old paintings and prints, where it is seen on the riverbank, at the foot of the Valkhof castle, for example in the painting called the Valkhof at Nijmegen.

Due to technical innovations in warfare, by the end of the 18th century, the round bastion had lost its importance as a defensive stronghold. A rise in the water level of the river Waal also meant that the tower was partly submerged. In 1789, a local carpenter, J. ten Boven, was given permission to build houses on the site of the bastion. He didn't demolish the tower completely, but just built the houses on top of the bastion. In 1987 these houses were demolished, and to almost every one's surprise the tower re-emerged.

From 1995 until 2015, the building was hidden behind a grey wall (to protect the porous marlstones and bricks against the weather), and housed a museum. In April 2015, the museum was closed for major reconstruction and restoration of the building. Plan is to re-open in 2016 as De Bastei, a centre for nature and cultural history.
