= Gerhard Noodt =

Dutch jurist

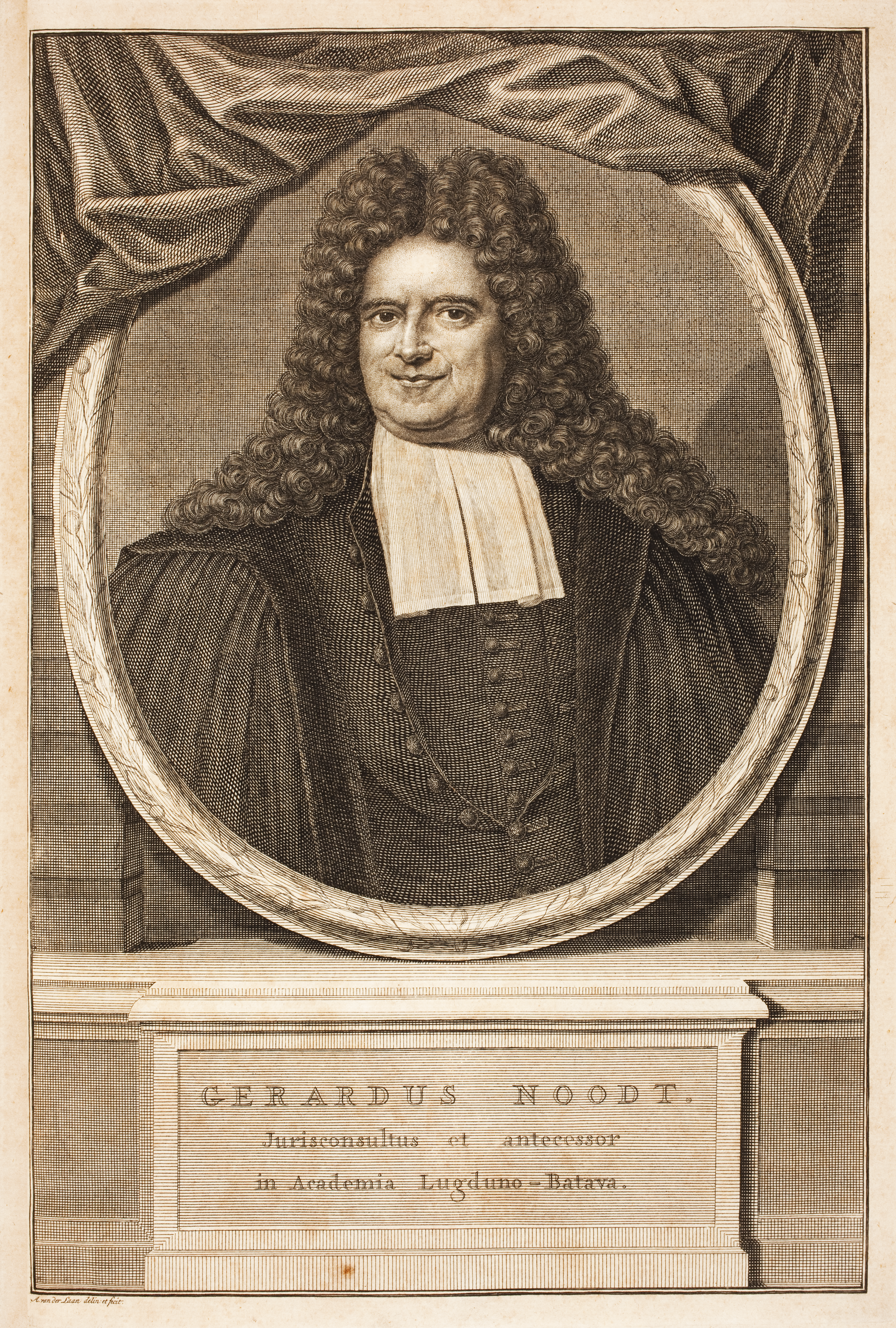
- Born: 4 September 1647; Nijmegen
- Died: 15 August 1725 (aged 77)
- Education: at Leiden, Utrecht, Franeker
- Occupation: jurist
- Known for: Latin style
- Notable work: Pouvoir des souverains, Liberté de conscience (translated into French)

Gerhard Noodt (4 September 1647 – 15 August 1725) was a Dutch jurist, born in Nijmegen. Educated at Leiden, Utrecht, and Franeker, he became a professor of law at the Nijmegen and the Franeker. As a writer on jurisprudence he acquired a wide reputation. His Latin style was modelled after the best writers, and his numerous works soon rose to the rank of standard authorities. Two of his political treatises were translated into French by Jean Barbeyrac, and appeared at Amsterdam in 1707 and 1714, under the respective titles of Pouvoir des souverains and Liberté de conscience.

The first edition of his collected works was published at Leiden in 1724 and the last in 1767. That of 1735 and those subsequent contain a life of the author by Barbeyrac.

== Works ==
- De civili prudentia, 1679
- De religione ab imperio jure gentium libera, 1706
  - De religione ab imperio jure gentium libera (in Latin). Lyon. 1708.
- an unfinished commentary on the Pandects, 1716
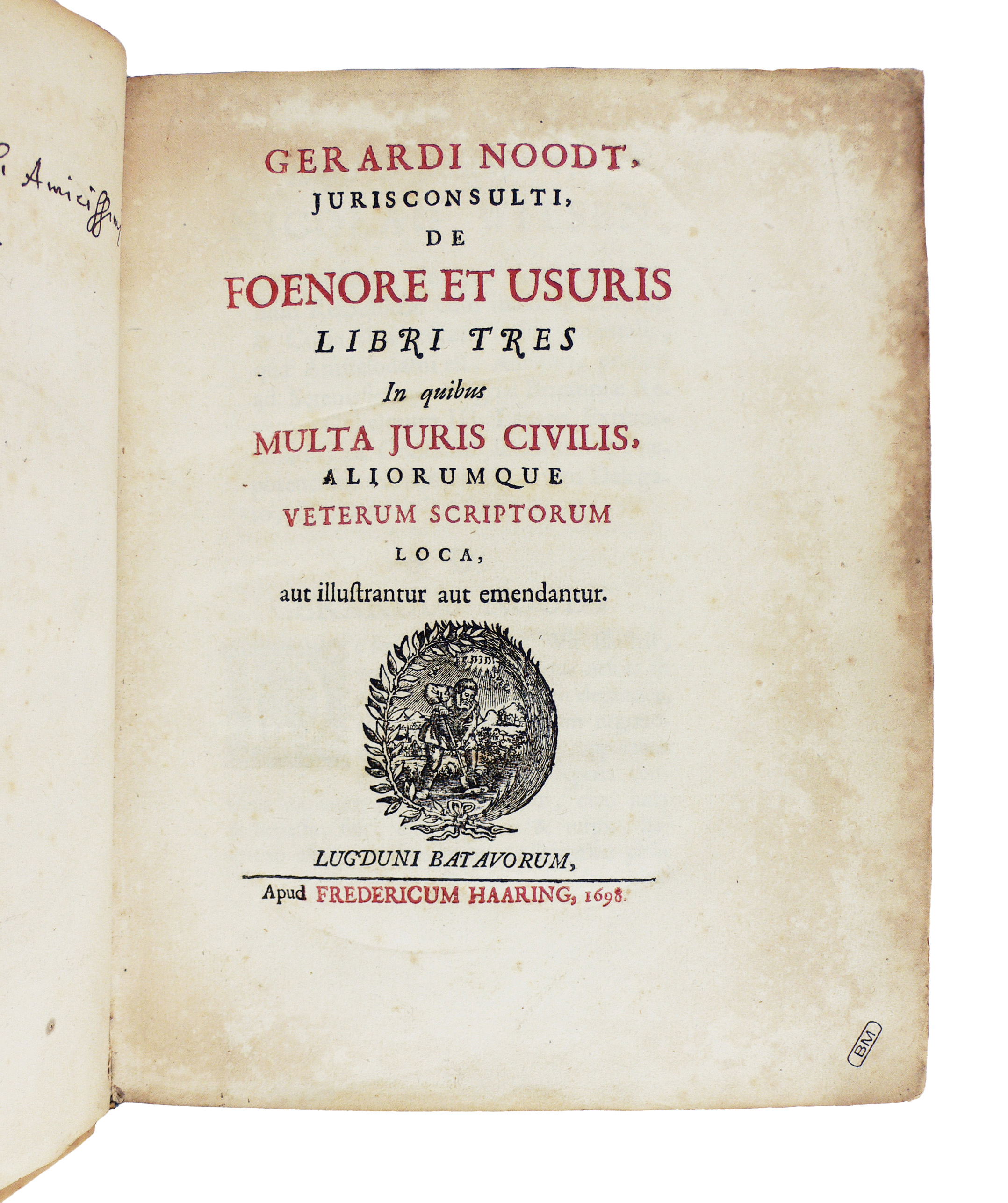
De foenore et usuris, 1698

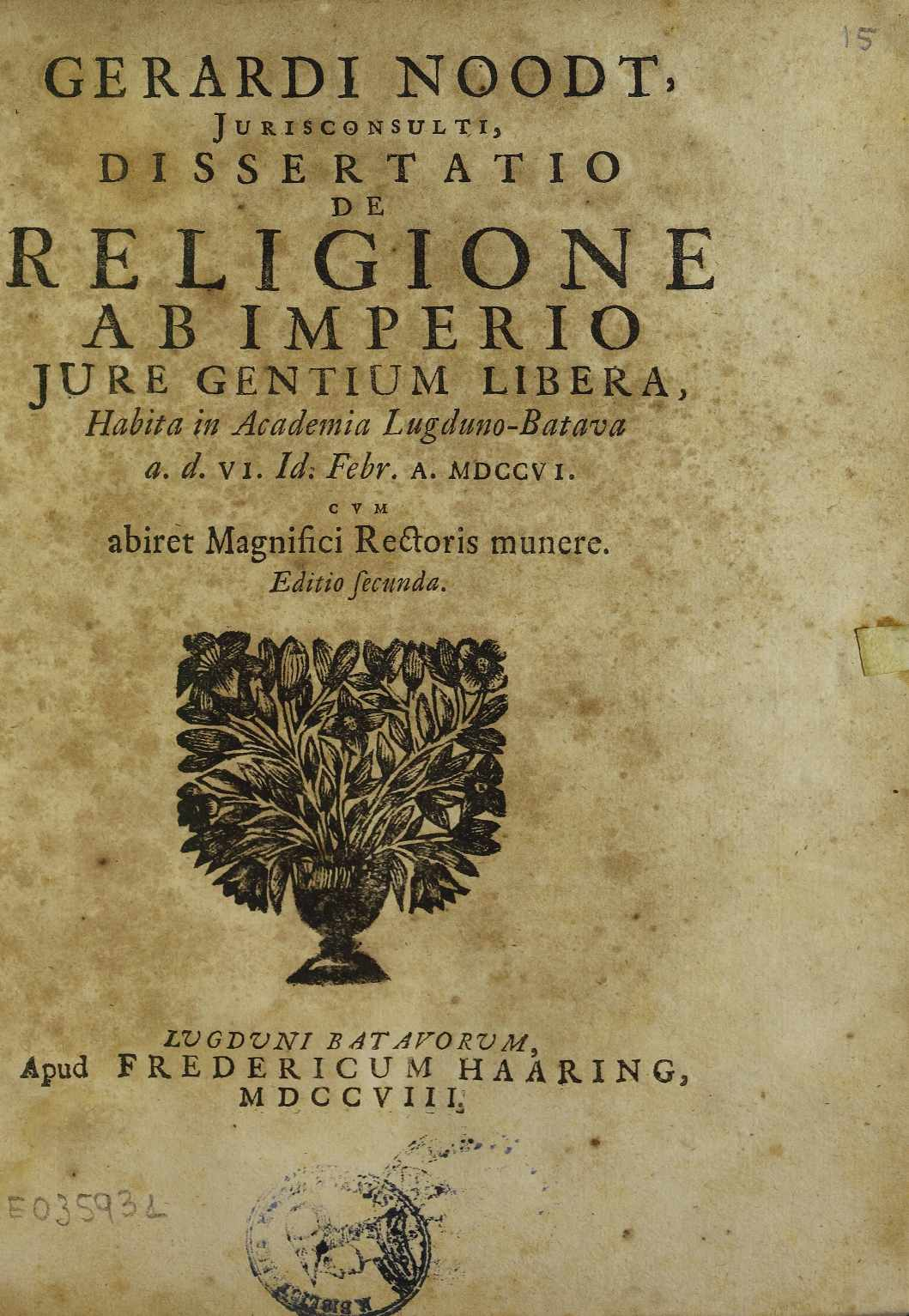
De religione ab imperio jure gentium libera, 1708
