= François Poullain de la Barre =

French philosopher (1647–1723)

The Reverend François Poullain de la Barre
- Born: July 1647; Paris, Kingdom of France
- Died: 4 May 1723 (aged 75); Geneva, Republic of Geneva
- Education: College of Sorbonne (M.A., 1663)
- Notable work: On the Equality of the Two Sexes; On the Education of Women; On the Excellence of the Men
- Spouse: Marie Ravier (m. 1690)

François Poullain de la Barre (French: [də la baʁ]; July 1647 – 4 May 1723) was an author, Catholic priest, and a Cartesian philosopher.

== Life ==
François Poullain de la Barre was born during July 1647 in Paris, France, to a family with judicial nobility. He added "de la Barre" to his name later in life. After graduation in 1663 with a master of arts, he spent three years at the College of Sorbonne where he studied theology. In 1679, he became an ordained Catholic priest. From 1679 to 1688, he led two modest parishes, Versigny and La Flamengrie, in Picardy in northern France.

In 1688, the Catholic Church was critical of Cartesianism, a philosophy that he had embraced early in his career, causing Poullain de la Barre to leave the priesthood and Picardy. Initially, he returned to Paris. By 1689, he had moved to Geneva where he converted to Calvinism, a branch of Protestantism. The following year, he married Marie Ravier. After a year as a tutor, he took a position teaching at a local Genevan university. After the Edict of Fontainebleau revoked the Edict of Nantes, he was exiled in the Republic of Geneva, where he obtained citizenship (bourgeoisie) in 1716. He spent the remainder of his life in Geneva, where he died on 4 May 1723.

== Work ==
During a physiology conference in 1667, a friend of Poullain de la Barre introduced him to Cartesianism, the philosophy of René Descartes. Poullain de la Barre later adopted the philosophy and applied Cartesian principles to feminist thought. He wrote many texts of social philosophy that denounced injustice against women and their social inequality. He opposed the discrimination women experienced and championed social equality between women and men.

Six years after his introduction to Cartesianism, Poullain de la Barre published a three part series on the condition of women. In 1673, he published On the Equality of the Two Sexes: A Physical and Moral Discourse, Which Shows That it is Important to Rid Oneself of Prejudice, which argues that the difference between men and women goes beyond the body, but is in the "constitution of the body". He rejected the idea that the minds of men and women differ, historically proclaiming "the mind has no sex". In claiming sexual difference lies in part through the "constitution of the body", Poullain de la Barre argued the unequal treatment that women experience in religious and educational instruction, and the effects of the environment, create a perceived apparent innate difference between the sexes. In his assessment, this does not have a natural basis, it is not essential, nor is it innate, but proceeds from cultural prejudice, and can be understood as social constructionism. Poullain de la Barre advocated for equal education of women, emphasizing that women should receive a true and quality education. He also asserted that all careers, including scientific ones, should be open to them.

In 1674, he published On the Education of Ladies: To Guide the Mind in Sciences and Morals, continuing his reflection on the education of women, but using Socratic dialogue in his thesis. He addresses the historical constrains of the time. In 1675, François Poullain de la Barre published the third in his series, On the Excellence of Men: Against the Equality of the Sexes". The title was sarcastic, instead the work is a rebuttal of those opposed to gender equality.

== Responses and critiques ==
Opinions about Poullain de la Barre's place in the history of feminism vary considerably, but his theories have often been used by others, such as Jean-Jacques Rousseau.

Simone de Beauvoir includes a quotation from Poullain de la Barre in an epigraph to The Second Sex in 1949: "All that has been written about women by men should be suspect, for the men are at once judge and party."

== Works ==
- De l’Éducation des dames pour la conduite de l’esprit dans les sciences et dans les mœurs, Paris, J. Du Puis, 1674
- De l’Excellence des hommes contre l’égalité des sexes, Paris, J. Du Puis, 1675
- De l’Égalité des deux sexes, discours physique et moral où l’on voit l’importance de se défaire des préjugez, Paris, J. Du Puis, 1676
- De l’Égalité des deux sexes, discours physique et moral où l’on voit l’importance de se défaire des préjugez, 2nd edition, Paris, 1679 (annotated transcript in modern French spelling)
- La Doctrine des protestans sur la liberté de lire l’Ecriture sainte, le service divin en langue entenduë, l’invocation des saints, le sacrement de l’Eucharistie, Genève, 1720.
