= Smetius Collection =

The Smetius Collection was a 17th-century collection of Roman provincial antiquities around the Dutch city of Nijmegen. Put together by Johannes Smetius (1591–1651) and his son Johannes Smetius Junior (1636–1704), both clergy at Nijmegen, the collection was instrumental in settling the debate about the exact location of the Batavians.

== History of the collection ==
Johannes Smetius Senior moved to Nijmegen in 1617 where his parents lived and worked as a preacher. Interested in history, he began collecting Roman antiquities which were frequently discovered in and around the city. In 1644 he published Oppidum Batavorum seu Noviomagum, in which he used his collection to argue that Tacitus' description of the Batavian fortress was Nijmegen.

In 1678 Johannes Smetius Junior published a catalogue of the collection under the title Antiquitates Neomagenses. This book is currently on sale, recently translated to Dutch, under the title Nijmeegse Oudheden (Antiquities from Nijmegen).

The two publications made the collection famous and its major importance in the scholarly debate about Roman activities in the Netherlands was recognized. The books also shed some light on the size of the collection, which encompassed over 10,000 Roman coins and about 4,500 other Roman antiquities.

Eventually the collection was sold to Johann Wilhelm, Elector Palatine and moved to Düsseldorf. Only the few pieces that were donated to the city of Nijmegen are left of the collection, as the sold majority dispersed over time and its contents are now untraceable.

== See also ==
- Nijmegen#History

== References and further reading ==
- Halbertsma, R. B. (2003), Scholars, Travellers, and Trade: The Pioneer Years of the National Museum of Antiquities in Leiden, 1818-1840, Routledge, p. 10-11
- Nellissen, L. (translator), Nijmeegse Oudheden, Stichting Stilus, ISBN 90-808719-1-5.
- Website of the Radboud University Nijmegen about Johannes Smetius Senior
