= Henricus Regius =

Dutch philosopher

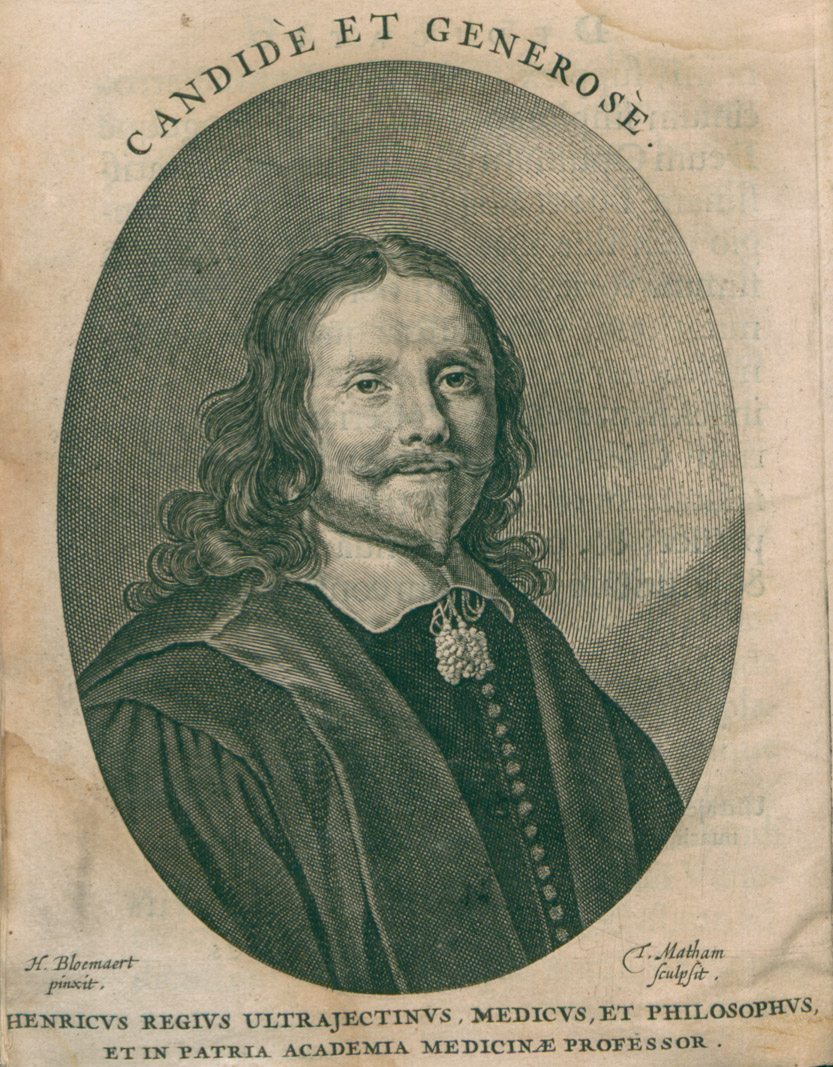
Henricus Regius portrayed in his Philosophia naturalis, 1661

Henricus Regius (/ˈriːdʒiəs/; July 29, 1598 – February 19, 1679) was a Dutch philosopher, physician, and professor of medicine at the University of Utrecht from 1638.

== Biography ==
Regius was born in Utrecht, and was also known by his birth name, Hendrik de Roy, or by its French rendering, Henri Le Roy. He studied liberal arts at the University of Franeker and medicine at Groningen University, Leiden University, and subsequently at the Universities of Montpellier and Padua.

He was a vocal proponent of Cartesianism, and corresponded frequently with René Descartes. He was the author of a textbook of natural philosophy, Fundamenta Physices.

He died in Utrecht.
