= Iatromathematicians =

Iatromathematicians (from Greek ἰατρική "medicine" and μαθηματικά "mathematics") were a school of physicians in 17th-century Italy who tried to apply the laws of mathematics and mechanics in order to understand the functioning of the human body. They were also keen students of anatomy. These iatromathematicians made an effort to prove that applying a purely mechanical conception to the study of the human body is futile. The mechanical conceptions that they had referred to was Leonardo da Vinci’s studies of the human body, and the writings of Aristotle about the motion of animals related to geometric analysis. Iatromathematicians considered the bodies functioning to be measured by quantifiable numbers, weights, and measures.

== Iatromathematics ==
The field of iatromathematics is allied to science; however, it lacks the applicability of the proper scientific method and is therefore considered a form of pseudoscience. It applies the study of astrology to medicine.

Iatromathematicians viewed the human body through astrological reasoning as well as mechanics. They associate various stars, or zodiac signs with the functioning of the human body. The twelve astrological signs contribute to each part of the body from head to toe. Moreover, planets and existing cosmos in space are correlated with certain parts of the body. Through examining a natal chart, iatromathematicians attempt to predict biological setbacks in an individual.

Iatromathematicians examine the active and energetic temperament of the human body. Moreover, they explore the causes of various health problems and attempt to find ways to treat certain detrimental diseases. In iatromathematics, there is a particular assumption that there is an impact of various energetic fields caused on the star bodies. The star body of an individual is often referred to by astrologers as an energetic matrix and is believed to be spawned by heavenly bodies such as the sun, moon, planets, and several other astrological signs.

Iatromathematicians study these conceptions and try to regulate the path of the star body of individuals so that it will give a positive, rather than a negative result. By doing so, they believe that it will contribute to a healthier lifestyle. Its doctrine is based on cosmobiology in which several emotional and physiological dilemmas in the body are associated with the positioning of celestial bodies in outer space.

Iatromathematics is closely correlated with biomechanics because the field of biomechanics investigates macrobiotic bodies to a macroscopic degree through the appliance of several engineering principles. The perspective of iatromathematicians differed from that of iatrophysicists and iatrochemists in terms of the way human bodies function. Iatrophysicists predicted the deviations from the biological norm of the body through the appliance of physics, while iatrochemists measured the detrimental problems of the body by chemical means.

== Ibn Ezra ==
Several individuals contributed to this field study of iatromathematics. For example, Ibn Ezra (Rabbi Avraham Ben Meir Ibn Ezra) wrote nine different astrological treatises. He covered all the subsections of astrology which include the branches of natal, medicinal, horary, electional, and mundane. Ibn Ezra's best known work was known as The Beginning of Wisdom. Over time, various individuals studied his works comprehensively. One such person was George Sarton, who is the founder of the History of Science Society.

Recently, Archibald Pitcairne was mentioned as the "forgotten father of mathematical medicine" and his contribution praised to creating the bases of iatromathematics.

== See also ==
- Medical astrology

== Bibliography ==
- Turner, Bryan S. (2007). Medical Power and Social Knowledge (2. ed.). London: Sage. ISBN 978-0803975996.
- Kirschmann, Anne Taylor (2004). A Vital Force: Women in American Homeopathy ([Online-Ausg.]. ed.). New Brunswick, N.J.: Rutgers University Press. ISBN 0813533201.
- Lewis, James R. (2003). The astrology book : the encyclopedia of heavenly influences (2nd ed.). Detroit: Visible Ink Press. ISBN 1578591449.
