= The Valkhof at Nijmegen =

1654 painting by Aelbert Cuyp

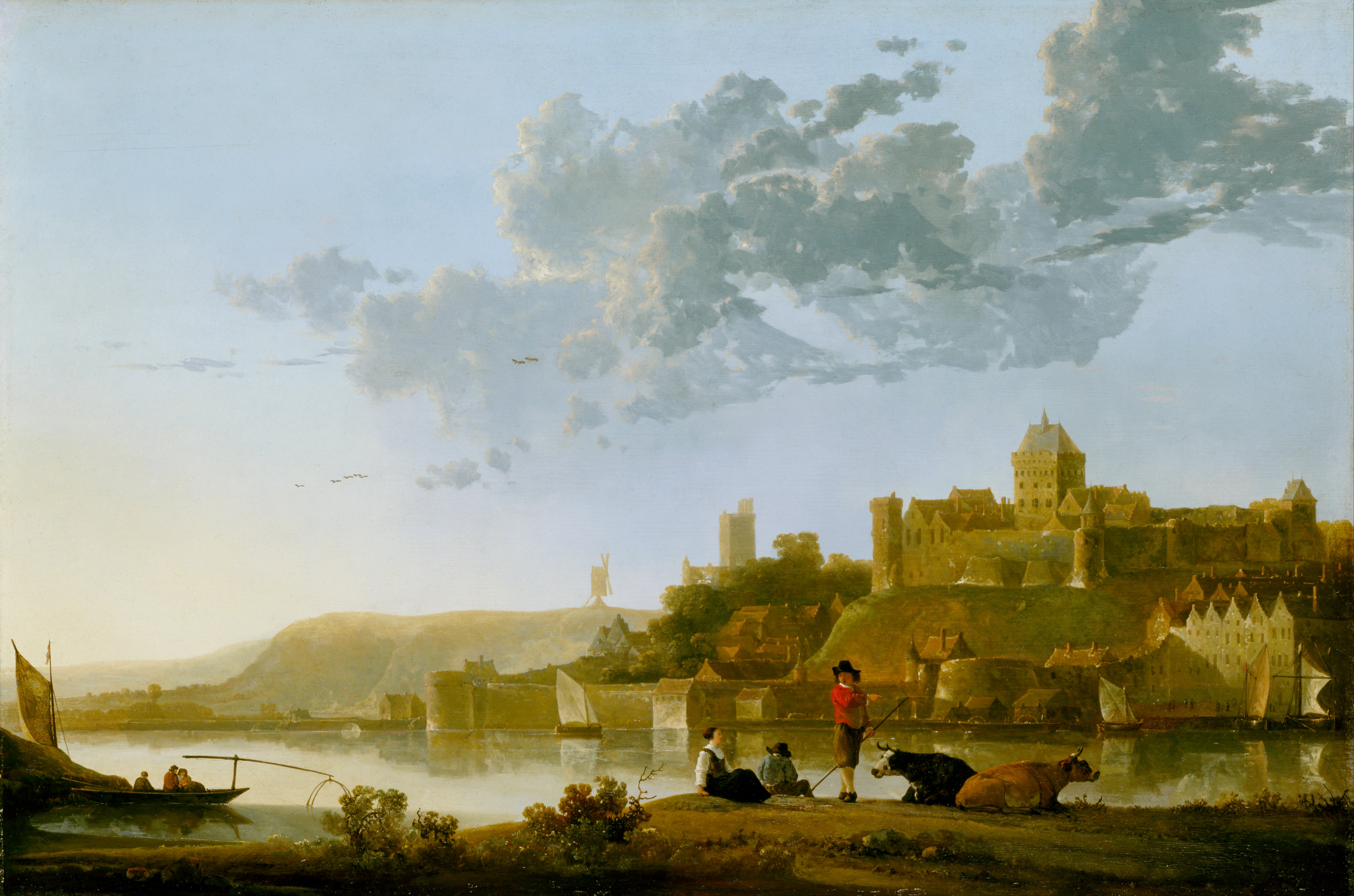
- Artist: Aelbert Cuyp
- Year: c. 1652–1654
- Medium: oil on wood
- Dimensions: 48.9 cm × 74 cm (19.25 in × 29 in)
- Location: Indianapolis Museum of Art; Indianapolis

The Valkhof at Nijmegen is an oil painting by the Dutch Golden Age painter Aelbert Cuyp, likely painted between 1652 and 1654. It is now held in the Indianapolis Museum of Art.

The Valkhof at Nijmegen typifies the Dutch landscape. A small boat filled with fisherman wait to capture lobsters. Two fat cows sit at the bank of the river, with their herder and two guests. The herder's red jacket is the focal point, drawing the eye in and breaking up the muted tones of the rest of the painting. Across the river, the looming Medieval architecture is bathed in a warm golden light from the seemingly setting sun. Boats float peacefully down the water banks, not disturbing the water. A windmill pokes up from the cliff face. Small, chunky clouds hover peacefully over the bay. Overall, the feelings of peace and tranquility run through the painting, with the stillness of the cattle, people, and water all reflecting the peaceful nature of the painting.

== Historical information ==
The town of Nijmegen was popular with artists during this time period. The city's Medieval history, with the Valkhof having strong patriotic ties. It was the stronghold of Gaius Julius Civilis, an ancient hero who led the Batavians to revolt against the Romans during the 1st century. During this time, it also paralleled the Dutch's rebellion against Spain and the Habsburg Empire.

The scene is based on sketches that Cuyp took during this travels to Nijmegen in 1652, however, Cuyp transformed the landscape by using a warm glow, calling to mind Italian landscapes. He adopted this style, and it became his signature on his paintings. Later on, Cuyp's work has a profound impact on 19th-century landscape painters, including J. M. W. Turner.

Because of the way that Cuyp painted his subjects bathed in light, it is hypothesized that he worked in Utrecht, which took many of its artistic cues from Baroque Italy. Cuyp dated very few of his paintings, so the date range on this image is an estimate.

== Provenance ==
The painting's oldest provenance record has it in the hands of the Dukes of Saxe-Coburg-Gotha, since at least 1826. It was sold in April 1937 to art historian/dealer Eduard Plietzsch. It was sold by the Galarie St. Lucas in Vienna in July of that year. The Valkhof became part of the John Herron Art Institute, now the Indianapolis Museum of Art in 1943, after a gift by Caroline Marmon Fesler.
