= Christopher Wittich =

Dutch theologian (1625–1687)

Christoph Wittich or Christophorus Wittichius (1625, in Brieg – 1687, in Leiden) was a Dutch theologian. He is known for attempting to reconcile Descartes's philosophy with the Scriptures.

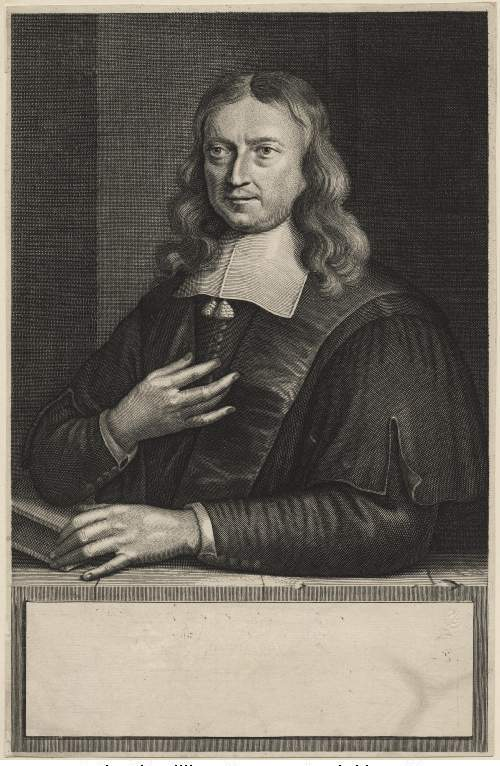
Christoph Wittich

== Life ==
He studied theology in Bremen, Groningen and Leiden, and taught theology, mathematics, and Hebrew at Herborn (1651–1653), Duisburg (1653–1655), Nijmegen (1655–1671) and Leiden (1671–1687). Starting from his 1653 publication Dissertationes Duæ he defended a non-literal interpretation of the Bible texts that were quoted by Voetius to prove the unscriptural nature of Descartes's Copernican beliefs, and tried to reconcile philosophy and theology.

== Works ==
- Dissertationes Duæ, Amsterdam, 1653.
- De Stylo Scripturae, Amsterdam (?), 1656
- Consensus veritatis in Scriptura divina et infallibili revelatae cum veritate philosophica a Renato detecta, Nijmegen, 1660
- Theologia pacifica, Leiden, 1671.
- Anti-spinoza, Amsterdam, 1690 (posthumous).
