= University of Nijmegen (1655–1680) =

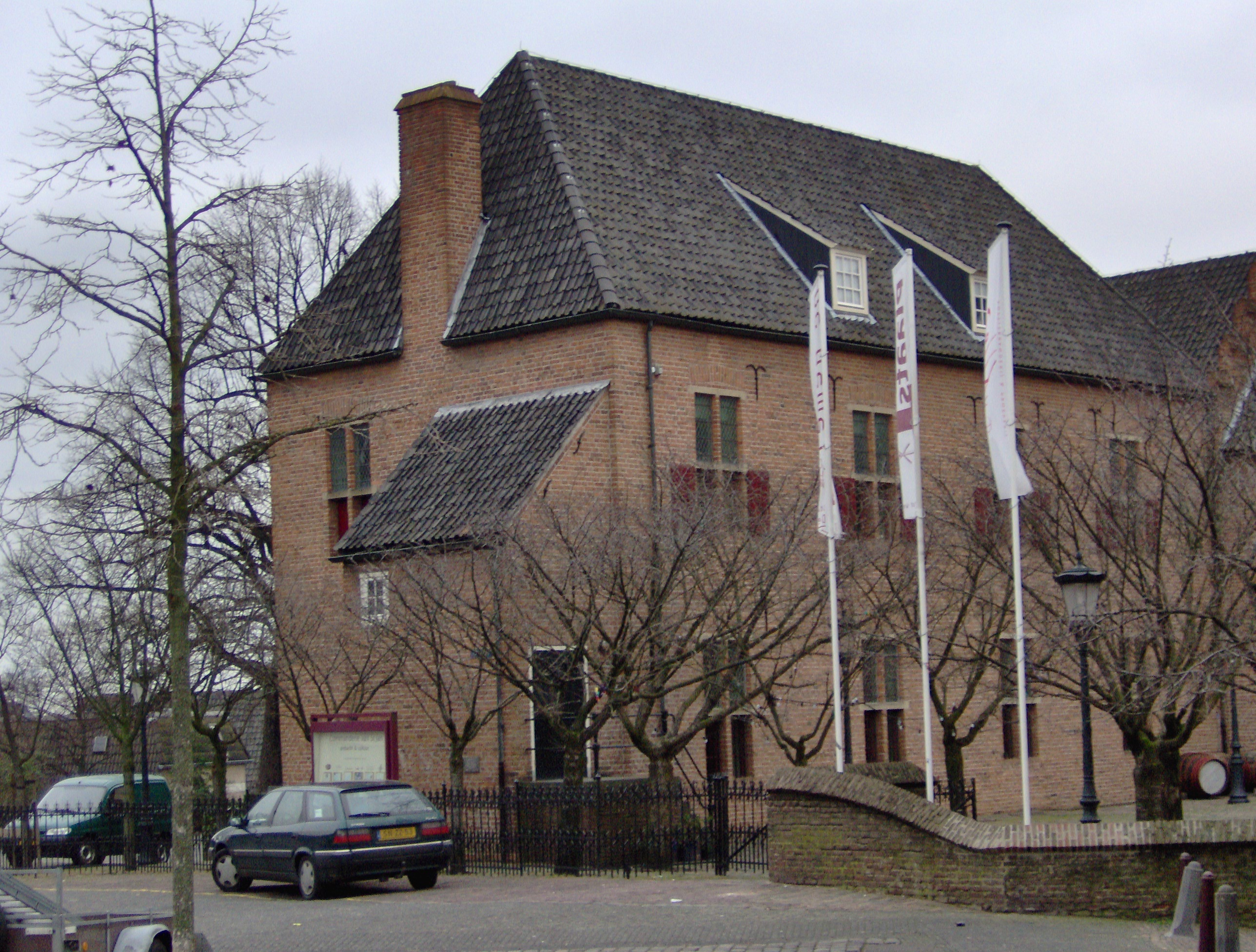
Commanderie St. Jan in Nijmegen

The University of Nijmegen (Kwartierlijke Academie van Nijmegen) was the first university in Nijmegen, Netherlands and existed between 1655 AD and approximately the year 1680.

It was founded as a Illustre school in 1655 and became a university in 1656. The local government supported the university and it became competitor for the University of Harderwijk as main university in the Gelders Province. The Commanderie St. Jan became its accommodation and the university had professors like Petrus de Greve, Christopher Wittich, Johan Teyler and Gerhard Noodt. The university was in conflict with the universities in Holland because the ideas of René Descartes were spread. In 1672 the university was closed because of the French occupation. It reopened in 1674 but never recovered. The university was closed between 1678 and 1682. Attempts were made to reopen a university in Nijmegen which finally succeeded with the opening of the Catholic University in 1923.
