= Saint Stephen's Church, Nijmegen =

Stevenskerk
- Grote of Sint-Stevenskerk
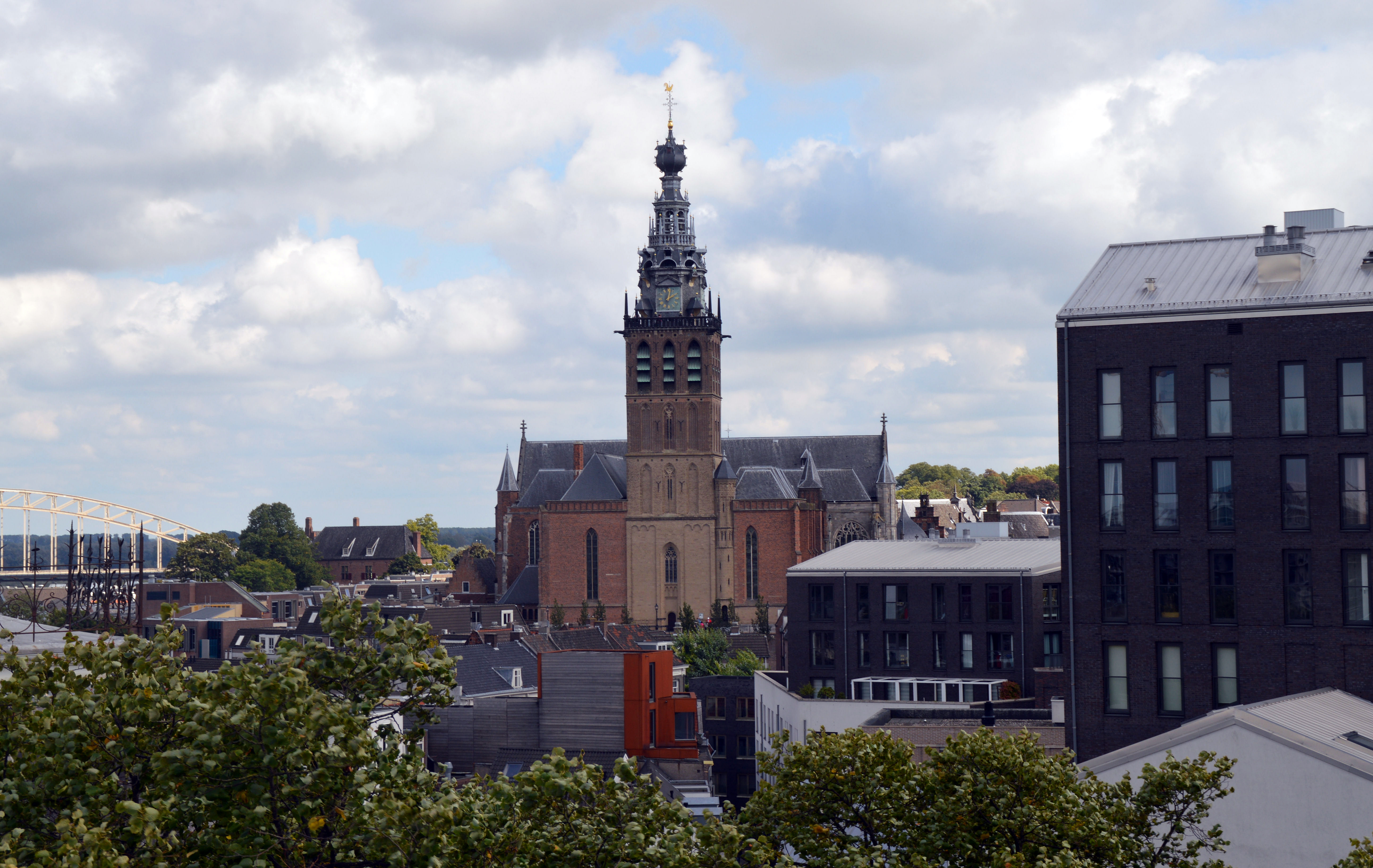
- Stevenskerk
- Location: Nijmegen

Architecture
- Style: late Gothic period

The Great Church or St. Stephen's Church colloquially called Steven's Church, is the oldest and largest church in Nijmegen, the Netherlands. The church is built on a small hill, the Hundisburg.

== History ==
The history of St. Stephen's dates back to the seventh century. The foundation of the church may be connected with the Christianization campaign of bishop Kunibert of Cologne in the seventh century. In 1247 Nijmegen came under the control of Count Otto II of Gelre. For strategic reasons, St. Stephen's was moved from the Kelfkensbos to its current location on the Hundisburg. The present church was consecrated in 1273 by Albertus Magnus. Administratively, St. Stephen's fell under the authority of the chapter of the Basilica of the Holy Apostles, Cologne. The church has long been the only parish in the city. The building was expanded several times in the thirteenth to sixteenth centuries, including an impressive ambulatory. Pope Sixtus IV authorized the establishment of its own chapter, in 1475, making St. Stephen's independent of Cologne. In 1591 Saint Stephen's was converted to a Protestant church after the city was captured from the Spanish (during which the steeple was severely damaged), which it has remained since except for a Catholic interlude around 1670.

Catherine of Bourbon was buried in the St. Stephen's Church, in 1469. Her son, Charles of Gelre, paid to have a monument to her placed in the church, which remains to this day.

In 1810 is by royal decree the church property was transferred to the Reformed Church; the civil community retained the ownership of the tower, as part of the city defenses.

The church was severely damaged by the bombing of the city in 1944, including loss of the main spire, but was rebuilt after the war with the restored spire being completed in 1969.

In 2001 the church received two stained-glass windows of Marc Mulders entitled Pelican and Stigmata.

== Current use ==
Today St. Stephen's Church is mainly used for weekly ecumenical church organ concerts on the famous König organ, exhibitions, cantus of the HRG Achelous, and orations. The Stevens Church is open for viewing.

== Gallery ==
Upper bell tower of church

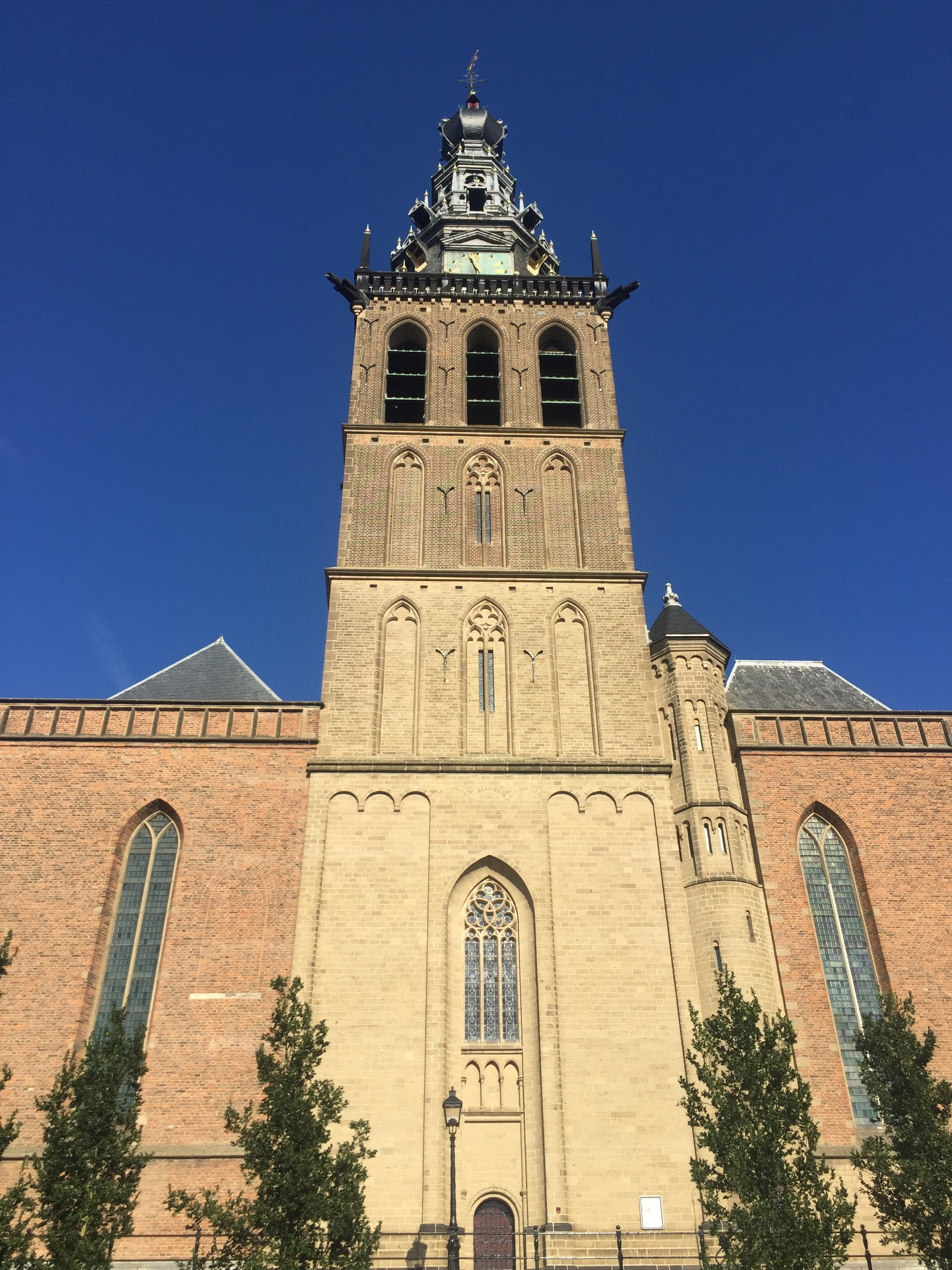
Bell tower of church

Front of church

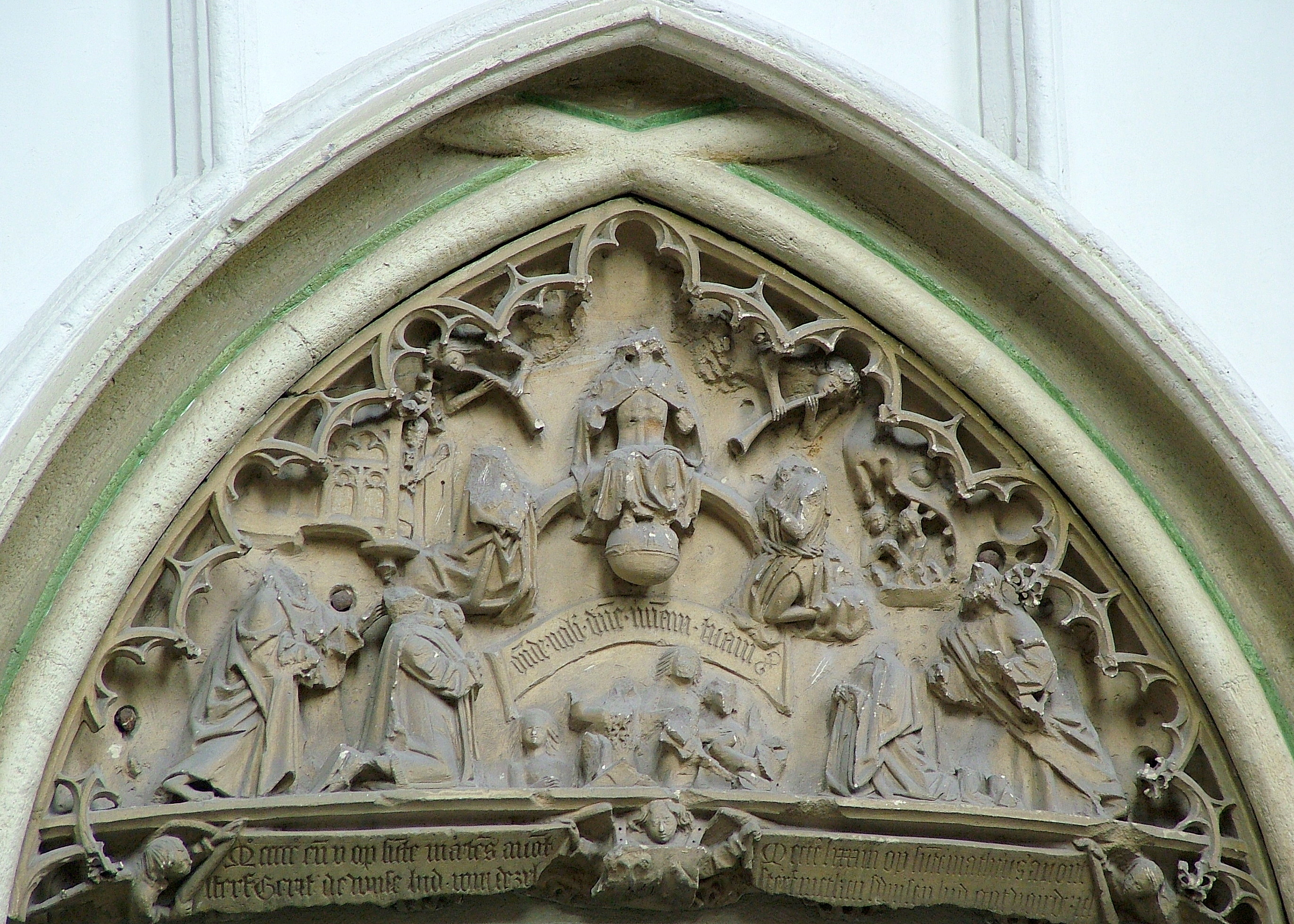
Iconoclastic above the entrance.

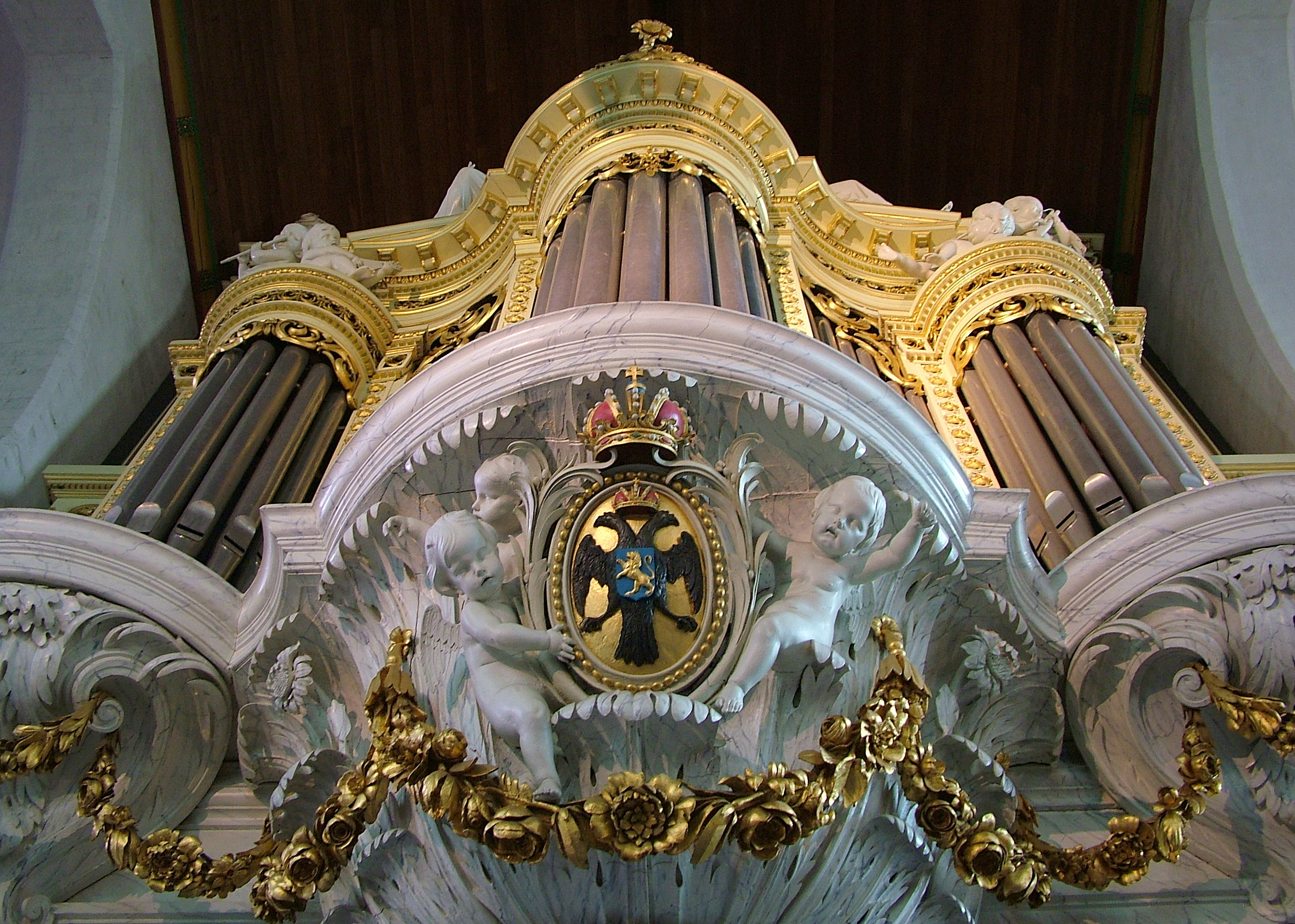
The König organ.

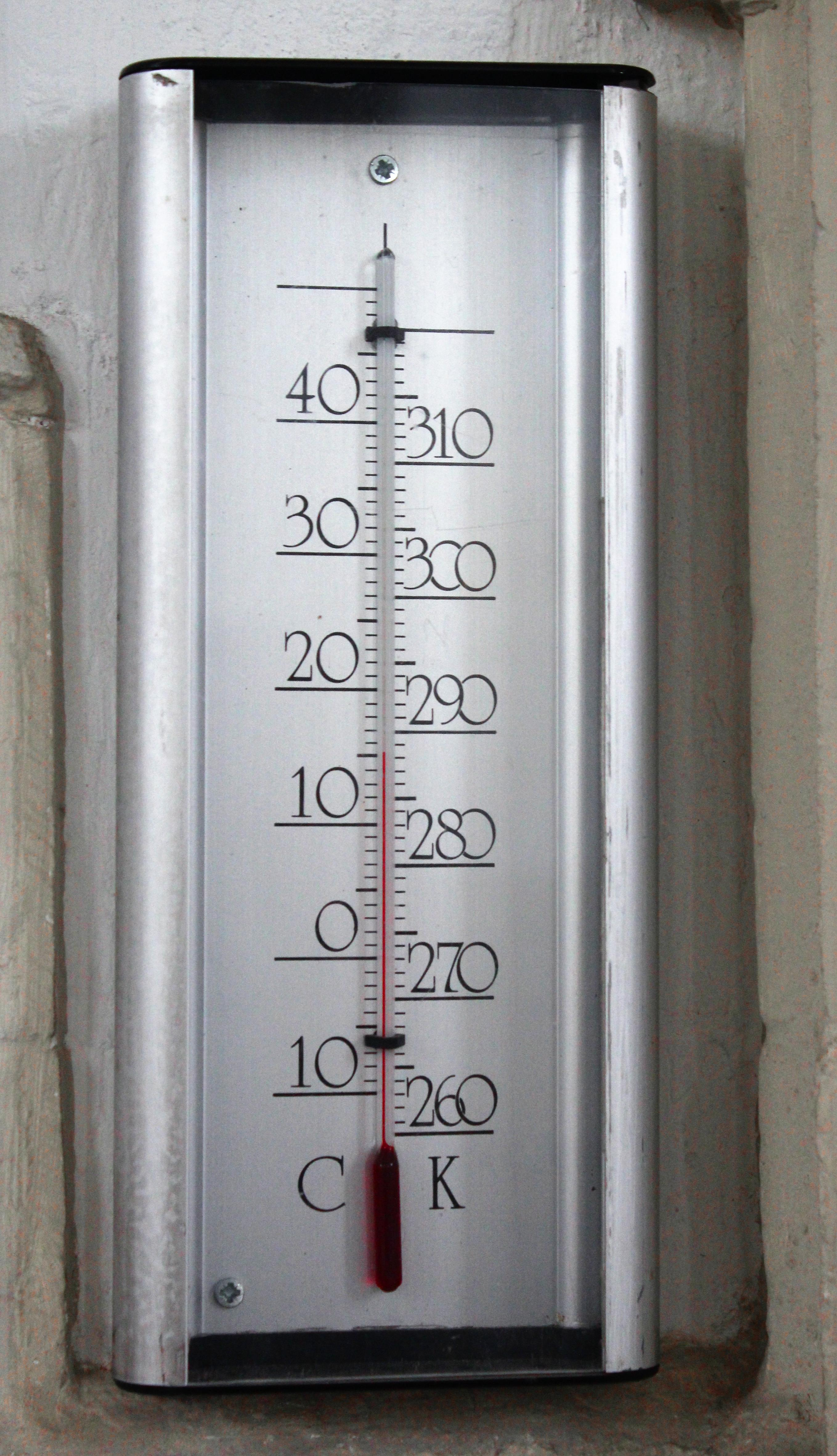
Thermometer with a scale in Celsius and Kelvin Scale attached to one of the pillars of the church
