= Jean Henri Pareau =

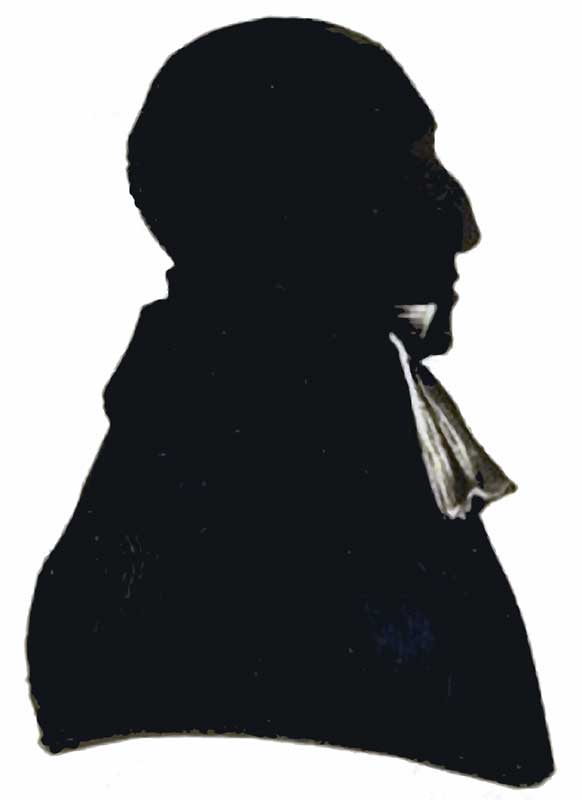
Silhouette of Jean Henri Pareau.

Jean Henri Pareau, also known as Joannes Henricus Pareau (13 May 1761, Amsterdam – 1 February 1833, Utrecht) was a Dutch Reformed theologian and orientalist. He was the father of theologian Louis Gerlach Pareau (1800–1866).

He studied Oriental languages in Amsterdam (Athenaeum Illustre) and Leiden. At Amsterdam, his instructors included Pieter Burman the Younger, Herman Tollius, Daniel Albert Wyttenbach and Henry Albert Schultens; in Leiden he was a student of David Ruhnken and Lodewijk Caspar Valckenaer. In 1810 he became a professor of theology at the University of Utrecht, where in 1815 he was appointed professor of Oriental languages, a position he maintained until 1830. In 1831 he was awarded with the title of "professor emeritus". In 1822/23 he served as university rector.

Pareau was a member of the "Maatschappij der Nederlandse Letterkunde" (Society of Dutch Literature) and an early member of the Royal Institute of Sciences, Literature and Fine Arts (1809–1816).

== Selected publications ==
- Antiquitas hebraica breviter descripta, 1817 (published in 12 editions).
- "Principles of interpretation of the Old Testament", 1822 (translated from the "Institutio interpretis Veteris Testamenti" by Patrick Forbes).
- Joannis Henrici Pareau oratio de honoris studio orientalium, 1823.
- Disputatio de mythica sacri codicis interpretatione, 1824.
