= Johannes Alberti =

Dutch theologian

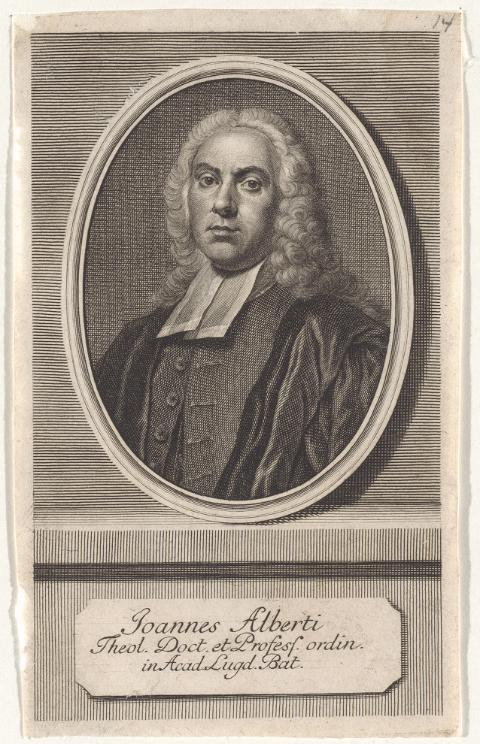
Alberti as professor at Leiden University

Johannes Alberti (March 6, 1698, in Assen – 13 August 1762, in Leiden) was a Dutch theologian.

== Early life ==
Alberti was the son of a flour miller. He did not regularly attend school due to the distance between his parents' house and the local school. However, the miller's apprentice, Jan Mulder, taught the boy to read. He made good progress, and soon the teacher took his student with him to the church. To his amazement, he noticed that the boy kept his attention on the pulpit. When Alberti returned home, his mother asked him if he remembered anything that had been said. He stood upon a wooden crate in the living room, recited the text of the sermon, and declaimed parts of it with such simplicity that his mother had tears in her eyes. From that moment on, the parents had the hope that their child could aim for something higher than the work of his parents. And he did not disappoint them: after having risen to the top of his class at the Latin school, he was sent to the University of Franeker in 1718. Here, he immersed himself in the study of Antiquity with Lambertus Bos and Campegius Vitringa. Vitringa also gave him a thorough education in theology. When he finished his studies in Franeker after six years, he was known as a person with excellent ability who held great promise for the advancement of science and his homeland.

== Minister ==
On 26 January 1721, Alberti was confirmed as a minister in Hoogwoud. Here, following the examples of Elsner, Raphelius, his teacher Bos and some other theologians, he collected passages and sayings from non-Christian texts that were similar to those used in the Greek language New Testament. He collected them in order to defend the style of the Evangelists and Apostles against scholars who considered these writers' style as poor and full of Hebrew sayings. The results of this careful research were published by Alberti in 1725 in his Letterkundige Aanteekeningen op de gewijde Schriften des Nieuwen Verbonds (Literary notes made on the sacred scriptures of the New Testament). This work did not have a running explanation. Instead, it highlighted some aspects of the Christian holy books by comparing them with the works of other Greek writers, explaining why the language used in the Old Testament was necessary, and indicating the best interpretation according to Alberti. He did all of this without ignoring the explanations of other theologians. Although it was lauded by many, the notes were mocked in the Acta Eruditorum, a critical journal published in Latin in Leipzig, and the young scholar was accused of plagiarism. Alberti replied to this in 1727 with a new publication, Kritische Proeve (Critical Essay), where he justified his earlier work extensively in the preamble and where he showed an extraordinary knowledge of Greek dictionaries and grammars. This thorough knowledge, developed in a work of only some 100 pages, showed the independent writer to be a staunch defender of Biblical truth and silenced his enemies. Shortly thereafter he made a Proeve van Kritische aanmerkingen nopens Hesychius (Essay on critical remarks concerning Hesychius), followed by numerous literary remarks to explain some passages in the New Testament of Philo Judaeus. These two works were presented in foreign journals, instead of appearing as independent publications.

Because Alberti dedicated himself to skills that were necessary and useful to a valuable minister and servant of the word of God, his fame as a preacher spread far and wide, and he was relocated from Hoogwoud to Krommenie in 1726 and to Haarlem in 1728. During his stay in Haarlem, he planned to make a new version of the dictionary of Hesychius of Alexandria. To make this work as complete as possible, he searched relentlessly and collected new sources everywhere. Among the papers presented to him for this purpose by Hamburg professor Johann Albert Fabricius was an old unpublished Greek dictionary of the New Testament. Comparing this with another he found later in the library of the University of Leiden and with a very old manuscript offered to him by his friend, the scholar Tiberius Hemsterhuis, Alberti succeeded in enriching the study of the Greek language with a new Greek dictionary of the New Testament, coupled with a very extensive list of ancient Greek authors who were mentioned in the Lexicon of Photios I of Constantinople.

== Professor ==
After returning in 1740 from a long trip to the neighbouring countries, Alberti was offered the position of professor of theology at the University of Leiden, which he accepted on 5 October with a speech on the combination of Theology and Judgment. From the moment he became professor, he tried to promote a free and discerning explanation of the Bible with his students. One of the consequences of this openness was that he became involved in the difficulties and persecution of one of his most proficient students, Antony van der Os, a teacher from Zwolle. The opponents of this teacher not only accused him of having learned his (in their opinion) incorrect views from Alberti, who hid behind the scenes and kept silent, but also openly declared that because of Alberti's teachings, the pure Reformed theology at the University of Leuden would be corrupted. The softhearted, calm Alberti, who had stated in one of his earliest books that only a bad understanding of the books of the Bible could lead to disputes in the church, was careful and intelligent enough not to appear to be bothered by the attacks of his enemies, even though he was well aware that the attacks were aimed especially against him. As a result, his unpublished academic lessons were openly attacked in an anonymous publication, Examen van het onderwerp van tolerantie, om de leer, in de Dordrechtsche Synode, ten jare 1619, vastgesteld, met de veroordeelde leer der Remonstranten te vereenigen, door een genootschap van voorstanders der Nederlandsche formulieren van eenigheid, in which Alberti was presented with the name Euruodius ("Wide gatekeeper"). Alberti responded with disdain to the ill-conceived language of his unrestrained but learned enemies. However, his colleague Albert Schultens defended him and his teachings with warmth.

During his professorship in Leiden, Alberti once held the position of rector, a position he withdrew from on 8 February 1749 with the speech Over het Nut der poëzy voor de Godgeleerden (On the use of Poetry in Theology). This speech was translated into Low German by Nozeman and put into verse by Pieter Merkman.

== Illness ==
Meanwhile, Alberti continued his beloved literary exercises and published in Leiden in 1746 the first part of Hesychius' dictionary. The scholars were not disappointed at the publication, and the book confirmed the great fame of Alberti. He was already far along in writing the second part of the dictionary when, in 1749, he was diagnosed with tuberculosis. The baths of Aachen and Spa, which he visited to find relief, suppressed the disease, but for three years he was unable to work. Even after his slow recovery, he was left with a persistent, partial paralysis of his hands, such that he could barely lift the pages of his books and found it very hard to write. Nevertheless, he continued to work for ten more years. He had finished the complete alphabet of Hesychius except for a few letters, when he succumbed to scarlet fever. The second part of the dictionary of Hesychius appeared in Leyden in 1762 due to the efforts of Ruhnkenius. Alberti had no children with his wife. She was the daughter of Mr. Philips van Ravestein, a man with knowledge in many disciplines.

== Legacy ==
For almost twenty-two years, Alberti had been a jewel of the University of Leiden. Through his lessons, he made major contributions toward a more accurate theology based on knowledge of the Greek language. His many writings exemplify the versatility of his knowledge. An excellent theologian and one of the best scholars of Biblical hermeneutics of his time, he also was filled with the spirit of Greek literature and with the very essence of it. He even had some skill with the lyre. Furthermore, he was no stranger to the literature and poetry of the Netherlands and succeeded in using this knowledge in his main studies. In his works, many traces of comparative linguistics can be found, clear evidence of his studies of the Dutch language. He was also proficient in Nordic History and Literature. He expressed gratitude toward his teacher, Lambertus Bos, in many of his writings.

He helped other scholars by making all the manuscripts that he owned available to all linguists. The following examples provide evidence of this helpfulness. When the Frisian scholar, Gijsbert Koen, worked on a publication of Gregory of Corinth, it was through Alberti that he received an important manuscript of his literary work from Basel. When Alberti heard that Johannes Pierson, the rector of Leeuwarden, was working on an edition of Moeris Atticista, he sent, without invitation, his own manuscript version of a very accurate comparison with the Leiden manuscript, previously owned by Gerhard Johann Vossius.
