= Daniel Albert Wyttenbach =

German-Swiss classical scholar (1746–1820)

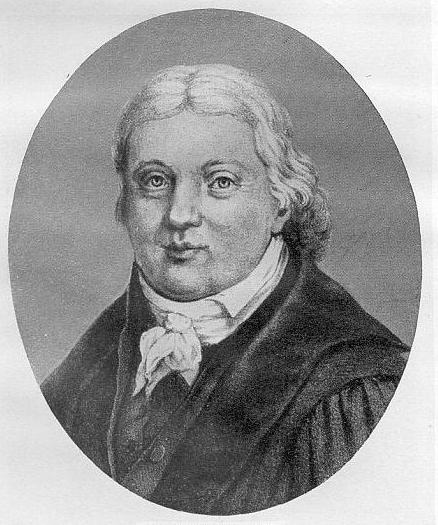
Daniel Albert Wyttenbach

Daniel Albert Wyttenbach (7 August 1746, Bern – 17 January 1820, Oegstgeest) was a German Swiss classical scholar. A student of Hemsterhuis, Valckenaer and Ruhnken, he was an exponent of the methods of criticism which they established, and with them he laid the foundations of modern Greek scholarship.

== Early life ==
He was born at Bern, of a noble family, and was extremely proud of his lineage, particularly his descent from Thomas Wyttenbach, professor of theology in Basel at the end of the 15th and beginning of the 16th century, who had taught Huldrych Zwingli and other distinguished pupils. Wyttenbach's own father was also a theological professor of considerable note, first at the University of Bern, and then at the University of Marburg. He moved to Marburg in 1756, partly because he had studied there under the famous Christian Wolff, and embodied the philosophical principles of his master in his own theological teaching.

Young Wyttenbach entered the University of Marburg at the age of fourteen, and studied there for four years. His parents intended him to be a Lutheran pastor. The first two years were given up to general education, principally to mathematics, "philology", philosophy, and history. The professor of mathematics, August Gottlieb Spangenberg, greatly influenced young Wyttenbach. He is said to have taught his subject with great clearness, and with equal seriousness and piety, often referring to God as the supreme mathematician, who had constructed all things by number, measure and weight.

"Philology" in the German universities of that age meant Hebrew and Greek. These two languages were generally handled by the same professor, and were taught almost solely to theological students. Wyttenbach's university course at Marburg was troubled about the middle of the time by mental unrest, due to the fascination exercised over him by John Bunyan's Pilgrim's Progress. It was Spangenberg who helped him recover. The principal study of the third year was metaphysics, which took Wyttenbach entirely captive. The fourth and last year was to be devoted to theology and Christian dogma.

Up to that time, Wyttenbach had submitted passively to his father's wishes concerning his career, but he now turned away from theological lectures, and devoted his leisure to the task of deepening and extending his knowledge of Greek literature. He possessed at the time, as he tells us, no more acquaintance with Greek than his own pupils at a later time could acquire from him during four months' study. He had access only to the bare texts of the authors. Wyttenbach was undaunted, and four years' persistent study gave him a knowledge of Greek such as few Germans of that time possessed. His love for philosophy carried him towards the Greek philosophers, especially Plato. During this period Ruhnken's notes on the Platonic lexicon of Timaeus fell into his hands. David Ruhnken was for him almost a superhuman being, with whom he imagined himself conversing in the spirit.

At twenty-two, he determined to go elsewhere in search of the aids to study which Marburg could not afford. His father, realizing the strength of his son's pure passion for scholarship, permitted and even advised him to seek Christian Gottlob Heine at the University of Göttingen. From Heine he received the utmost kindness and encouragement, and he was urged to dedicate to Ruhnken the first-fruits of his scholarships. Wyttenbach set to work on some notes to Julian, Eunapius and Aristaenetus, and Heine wrote to Ruhnken to obtain his favourable consideration for the work. Before it reached him, Ruhnken wrote a kind letter to Wyttenbach, which the recipient "read, re-read and kissed," and another on receipt of the tract, in which the great scholar declared that he had not expected to find in Germany such knowledge of Greek, such power of criticism, and such mature judgment, especially in one so young. By Heine's advice, he worked hard at Latin, which he knew less thoroughly than Greek, and Heine praised his progress in Latin style to Ruhnken and Valckenaer.

He then wrote to ask their advice about his scheme of coming to the Netherlands to follow the profession of a scholar. Ruhnken encouraged Wyttenbach to follow his own example, for he too had been designed by his parents for the Christian ministry in Germany, but had settled at Leiden on the invitation of Tiberius Hemsterhuis. Valckenaer agreed, but added that Wyttenbach's letter would have been pleasanter to him had it been free from excessive compliments. These letters were forwarded to the elder Wyttenbach, with a strong recommendation from Heine. The old man had been in Leiden in his youth, and admired the scholarship of the Netherlands; so his consent was easily won.

== Academic career ==
Wyttenbach reached Leiden in 1770. He spent a year learning the language of the people, attending the lectures of the great duumviri of Leiden, and collating manuscripts of Plutarch. At the end of 1771 a professor was wanted at Amsterdam for the college of the Remonstrants. On the recommendation of Ruhnken, Wyttenbach obtained the chair, which he held with great success for eight years. His lectures were wide-ranging. Those on Greek were repeated to the students of the university of Amsterdam (the "Athenaeum"). In 1775 a visit was made to Paris, which was fruitful both of new friendships and of progress in study.

About this time, on the advice of Ruhnken, Wyttenbach began issuing his Bibliotheca critica, which appeared at intervals for the next thirty years. The methods of criticism were in the main those established by Hemsterhuis, and carried on by Valckenaer and Ruhnken, and the publication was accepted by the learned all over Europe. In 1777 the younger Burmann ("Burmannus Secundus") retired from his professorship at the Athenaeum, and Wyttenbach was disappointed not to be chosen to succeed him. Only his regard for Ruhnken and for Dutch freedom (in his own words Ruhnkeni et Batavae libertatis cogitatio) kept him in Holland. For fear of losing him, the authorities at Amsterdam nominated him professor of philosophy in 1779.

In 1785, Toll, Burmann's successor, resigned, and Wyttenbach was appointed to succeed him. His full title was "professor of history and eloquence and Greek and Latin literature." He had hardly got to work in his new office when Valckenaer died, and he received a call to Leiden. Greatly to Ruhnken's disappointment, he declined to abandon the duties he had so recently undertaken. In 1787 began the internal commotions in Holland, afterwards to be aggravated by foreign interference. Scarcely during the remaining thirty-three years of Wyttenbach's life was there a moment of peace in the land. About this time two requests were made to him for an edition of the Moralia of Plutarch, for which a recension of the tract De sera numinis vindicta had marked him out in the eyes of scholars. One request came from the famous Societas Bipontina, the other from the delegates of the Clarendon Press at Oxford, England. Wyttenbach, influenced at once by the reputation of the university, and by the liberality of the Oxonians in tendering him assistance of different kinds, declined the offer of the Bipontine Society — very fortunately, since their press was soon destroyed by the French.

The first portion of Wyttenbach's work was safely conveyed to Oxford in 1794. Then war broke out between Holland and Britain. Randolph, Wyttenbach's Oxford correspondent, advised that the next portion should be sent through the British ambassador at Hamburg, and the manuscript was duly consigned to him "in a little chest well protected by pitch." After sending Randolph a number of letters without getting any answer, Wyttenbach in disgust put all thought of the edition from him, but at last the missing box was discovered in a forgotten corner at Hamburg, where it had lain for two years and a half. The work was finally completed in 1803.

Meanwhile, Wyttenbach received invitations from his native city, Bern, and from Leiden, where vacancies had been created by the refusal of professors to swear allegiance to the new Dutch republic set up in 1795, to which Wyttenbach had made submission. But he only left Amsterdam in 1799, when on Ruhnken's death he succeeded him at Leiden as professor and 13th Librarian of Leiden University. Even then his chief object in moving was to facilitate an arrangement by which the necessities of his old master's family might be relieved. His move came too late in life, and he was never so happy at Leiden as he had been at Amsterdam. Before long appeared the ever-delightful Life of David Ruhnken. Though written in Latin, this biography deserves to rank high in the modern literature of its class. Of Wyttenbach's life at Leiden there is little to tell.

The continual changes in state affairs greatly disorganized the universities of Holland, and Wyttenbach had to work in face of much detraction; still, his success as a teacher was very great. In 1805 he narrowly escaped with his life from the great gunpowder explosion, which killed 150 people, among them the Greek scholar Jean Luzac, Wyttenbach's colleague in the university. One of Wyttenbach's letters gives a vivid account of the disaster. During the last years of his life he suffered severely from illness and became nearly blind. After the conclusion of his edition of Plutarch's Moralia in 1805, the only important work he was able to publish was his well-known edition of Plato's Phaedo.

Many honours were conferred upon him both at home and abroad, and in particular he was made a member of the French Institute. Shortly before his death, he obtained the licence of the king of Holland to marry his sister's daughter, Johanna Gallien, who had for twenty years been his housekeeper, secretary and research assistant. The sole object of the marriage was to secure for her a better provision after her husband's death, because as the widow of a professor she would be entitled to a pension. Gallien was a woman of remarkable culture and ability, and wrote works held in great repute at that time. On the festival of the tercentenary of the foundation of the university of Marburg, celebrated in 1827, the degree of doctor was conferred upon her. Wyttenbach died of apoplexy in 1820, and he was buried in the garden of his country house near Leiden, which stood, as he noted, within sight of the dwellings of Descartes and Boerhaave.

Wyttenbach's biography was written in a somewhat dry and lifeless manner by Mahne, one of his pupils, who also published some of his letters. His Opuscula, other than those published in the Bibliotheca critica, were collected in two volumes (Leiden, 1823).

== Evaluation ==
Although his work is not on the same level as that of Hemsterhuis, Valckenaer and Ruhnken, he was a very eminent exponent of the sound methods of criticism which they established. These four men, more than any others after Richard Bentley, laid the foundations of modern Greek scholarship. The precise study of grammar, syntax and style, and the careful criticism of texts by the light of the best manuscript evidence, were upheld by these scholars in the Netherlands when they were almost entirely neglected elsewhere on the Continent, and were only pursued with partial success in England. Wyttenbach may fairly be regarded as closing a great period in the history of scholarship. He lived indeed to see the new birth of German classical learning, but his work was done, and he was unaffected by it. Wyttenbach's criticism was less rigorous, precise and masterly, but perhaps more sensitive and sympathetic, than that of his great predecessors in the Netherlands. In actual acquaintance with the philosophical writings of the ancients, he has probably never been surpassed. In character he was upright and simple-minded, but shy and retiring, and often failed to make himself appreciated. His life was not passed without strife, but his few friends were warmly attached to him, and his many pupils were for the most part his enthusiastic admirers.
