= Johann August Ernesti =

German rationalist theologian and philologist (1707–1781)

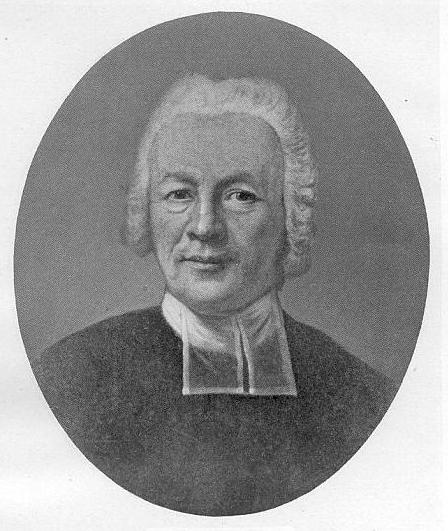
- Born: 4 August 1707; Tennstedt, Holy Roman Empire
- Died: 11 September 1781 (aged 74); Leipzig, Electorate of Saxony
- Occupations: Theologian, classical philologist, educator
- Spouse: Rahel Friederike Amalie Dathe (m. 1744; died 1745)
- Children: 1
- Father: Johann Christoph Ernesti

Academic background
- Education: University of Wittenberg; Leipzig University
- Academic advisor: J. C. Gottsched

Academic work
- Institutions: Leipzig University
- Notable students: C. G. Heyne; Ernst Platner

Johann August Ernesti (/ɛərˈnɛsti/; German: [ɛʁˈnɛsti]; 4 August 1707 – 11 September 1781) was a German rationalist Lutheran theologian and philologist. Ernesti was the first who formally separated the hermeneutics of the Old Testament from those of the New.

== Biography ==
Ernesti was born in Tennstedt, in the Electorate of Saxony (in present-day Thuringia), where his father, Johann Christoph Ernesti, was pastor, besides being superintendent of the electoral dioceses of Thuringia, Salz, and Sangerhausen. At the age of sixteen, Ernesti was sent to the celebrated Saxon cloister school of Pforta (Schulpforta). At twenty, he entered the University of Wittenberg, and studied afterwards at the University of Leipzig. In 1730, he was made master in the faculty of philosophy. In the following year he accepted the office of conrector in the Thomas school of Leipzig, of which Johann Matthias Gesner was then rector, an office to which Ernesti succeeded in 1734. He was, in 1742, named professor extraordinarius of ancient literature in the University of Leipzig, and in 1756 professor ordinarius of rhetoric. In the same year, he received the degree of doctor of theology, and in 1759 was appointed professor ordinarius in the faculty of theology. Through his learning and his manner of discussion, he co-operated with S. J. Baumgarten of Halle (1706–1757) in disengaging the current dogmatic theology from Lutheran Orthodoxy, along with any Lutheran scholastic or mystical influences, and thus paved a way for a Rationalist revolution in theology. He died in Leipzig, after a short illness, in his seventy-sixth year.

== Work ==
Apart from the quality of his own writing, Ernesti is notable for his influence on sacred and profane criticism in Germany. With J. S. Semler he co-operated in the Rationalist revolution of Lutheran theology, and in conjunction with Gesner he instituted a new school in ancient literature. He detected grammatical niceties in Latin, in regard to the consecution of tenses which had escaped preceding critics.

As an editor of the Greek classics, Ernesti does not compare with his Dutch contemporaries, Tiberius Hemsterhuis, L. C. Valckenaer, David Ruhnken or his colleague J. J. Reiske. The higher criticism was not even attempted by Ernesti. But to him and to Gesner is due the credit of having formed, by discipline and by example, philologists greater than themselves, and of having kindled the national enthusiasm for ancient learning.

It is chiefly in hermeneutics that Ernesti has any claim to eminence as a theologian. But here his merits are distinguished, and, at the period when his Institutio Interpretis Novi Testamenti (Principles of New Testament Interpretation) was published (1761), almost peculiar to himself. In it we find the principles of a general interpretation, formed without the assistance of any particular philosophy, but consisting of observations and rules which, though already enunciated, and applied in the criticism of the profane writers, had never rigorously been employed in biblical exegesis. He was, in fact, the founder of the grammatico-historical school. He admits in the sacred writings as in the classics only one acceptation, and that the grammatical, convertible into and the same with the logical and historical. Consequently, he censures the opinion of those who in the illustration of the Scriptures refer everything to the illumination of the Holy Spirit, as well as that of others who, disregarding all knowledge of the languages, would explain words by things. The "analogy of faith," as a rule of interpretation, he greatly limits, and teaches that it can never afford of itself the explanation, of words, but only determine the choice among their possible meanings. At the same time he seems unconscious of any inconsistency between the doctrine of the inspiration of the Bible as usually received and his principles of hermeneutics.

== Conflict with J. S. Bach ==
Beginning in 1736, Ernesti became involved in a protracted dispute with J. S. Bach, who was cantor at the Thomas school at the time. The dispute concerned the appointment of a student prefect to lead musical performances whom Bach objected to, on grounds Ernesti considered spurious. This acrimonious conflict resulted in multiple letters to city officials and ultimately the king, despite the fact that Ernesti had served as godfather to Bach's children.

== Legacy ==
Ernesti's most notable follower was the German theologian Samuel Friedrich Nathanael Morus.

His work influenced Johann Gottfried Herder and Friedrich Schleiermacher.

== Works ==
Works on classical literature

- Initia doctrinae Solidioris (1736), many subsequent editions
- Initia rhetorica (1750)
- editions, mostly annotated, of Xenophon's Memorabilia (1737)
- Cicero (1737–1739)
- Suetonius (1748)
- Tacitus (1752)
- the Clouds of Aristophanes (1754)
- Homer (1759–1764)
- Callimachus (1761)
- Polybius (1764)
- the Quaestura of Corradus
- the Greek lexicon of Benjamin Hedericus (edited and expanded by Ernesti in 1767)
- the Bibliotheca Latina of Fabricius (unfinished)
- Archaeologia literaria (1768)
- Horatius Tursellinus De particulis (1769)

Works on sacred literature

- Antimuratorius sive confutatio disputationis Muratorianae de rebus liturgicis (1755–1758)
- Neue theologische Bibliothek, vols. i. to x. (1760–1769)
- Institutio interpretis Nov. Test. (3rd ed., 1775)
- Neueste theologische Bibliothek, vols. i. to x. (1771–1775).

Besides these, he published more than a hundred smaller works, many of which have been collected in the three following publications: Opuscula oratoria (1762); Opuscula philologica et critica (1764); Opuscula theologica (1773).

== See also ==
- Ernst Platner, his foster son
