= Friedrich Ludwig Abresch =

Dutch philologist

Friedrich Ludwig Abresch (29 December 1699 in Homburg – 1782) was a Dutch philologist of German origins.

Born in Homburg, the reasons that led him to move to the Dutch Republic are uncertain. He visited the college in Herborn and the University of Utrecht. He was a scholar of Karl Andreas Duker and Arnold Drakenborch. However he followed rather the teachings of Tiberius Hemsterhuis and engaged in Greek literature as far as his work allowed this.

In 1723 he was appointed co-rector, in 1725 rector in Middelburg. After the death of his first wife, he remarried a rich woman from Zwolle and willingly accepted the offer to take the local rectorate. He remained in office until his death in 1782.

== Publications ==
- several articles in Miscellaneae observationes, beginning with volume 7.
- Animadversiones in Aeschylum libri II, 1743
- Lectionum Aristaenetearum libri II, 1749
- Virorum aliquot eruditorum in Arist. coniecturae, 1752
- Dilucidationes Thucydideae 1753, 1755
- Animadversiones in Aeschylum libri III, 1763

== Sources ==
- Allgemeine Deutsche Biographie - online version
