= Johannes Stricker =

Dutch theologian and biblical scholar

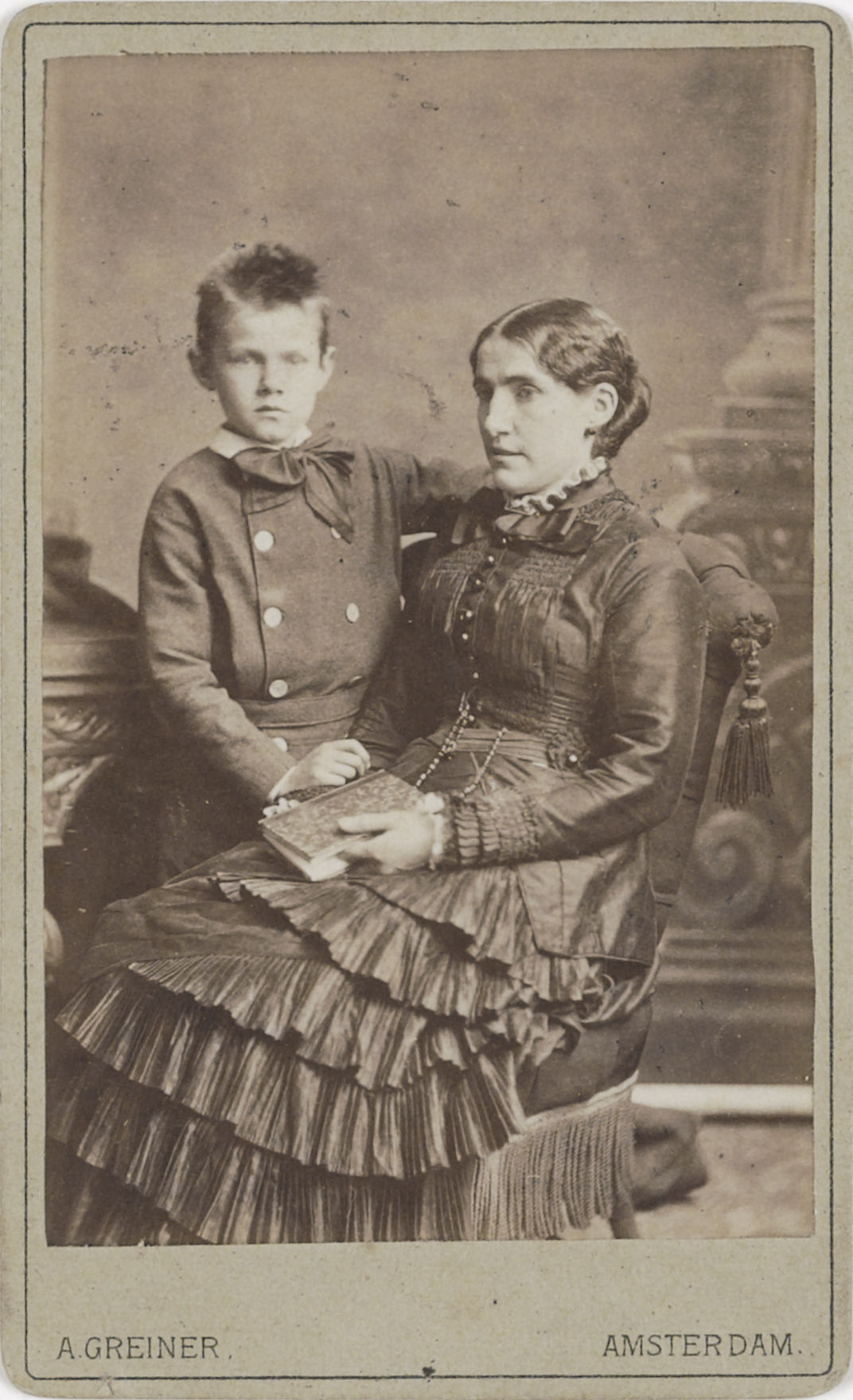
A photo of Kee Vos Stricker with her son taken around 1879/1880 by Albert Greiner.

Johannes Paulus Stricker (18 October 1816 – 27 August 1886) was a Dutch theologian and biblical scholar. He attended the University of Leiden where he worked with J. F. van Oordt, a key figure in the new Groningen theology. He sat his ordination examination in May 1841, and was appointed to a ministerial post in October of that year. In December of that year, he married Willemina Carbentus, an older sister of Vincent van Gogh's mother. As an uncle, he tutored the young Vincent in theology and biblical criticism in 1877–78.

In the summer of 1881, van Gogh became infatuated with Strickers daughter Kee. He proposed marriage, but was rebuffed with an adamant "no, nay, never" ("nooit, neen, nimmer"). Undeterred, he nevertheless continued to press his attentions despite the increasing dismay and disapproval of his family, which eventually led to his leaving the family home for a while to study drawing at The Hague with his cousin-in-law Anton Mauve.

== Works ==
- Bijbels woordenboek voor het Christelijke Gezin, (1855) (Biblical Dictionary for the Christian Family)
- Het Geloof in Jezus Christus, de Eenige Weg tot Zaligheid, (1861) (Belief in Jesus Christ, the only Way to Salvation)
- Jezus van Nazareth volgens de Historie Geschetst, (1868) (Jesus of Nazareth, Drawn according to History)
