= Willem Muurling =

Dutch theologian

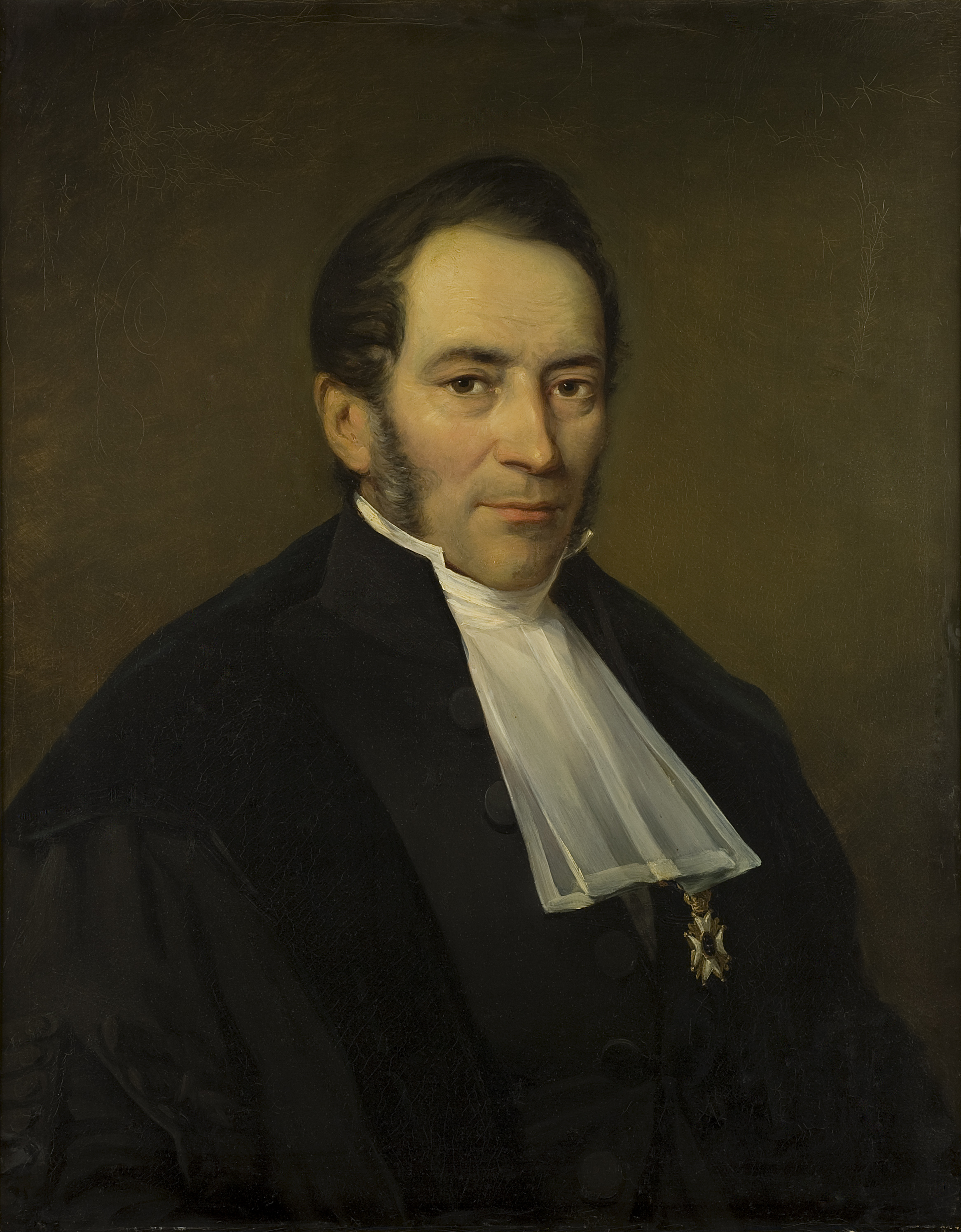
Willem Muurling, by Jan Ensing (1851/52)

Willem Muurling (27 April 1805, Bolsward – 9 December 1882, The Hague) was a Dutch theologian who was a native of Bolsward. He was father-in-law to theologian Abraham Kuenen (1828-1891).

He studied theology at Utrecht, and from 1832 to 1837, served as a pastor in Stiens. Afterwards, he taught classes at the Rijksatheneum in Franeker, relocating to the University of Groningen in 1840, where he was as a professor of theology.

Muurling was a prominent member of the so-called "Groningen School", a progressive movement within the Dutch Reformed Church.

== Works ==
Among his better written efforts was a textbook on practical theology titled Practische Godgeleerdheid of beschouwing van de Evangeliebediening. Other published works by Muurling include:

- Louis Gerlach Pareau: Een Levensbeeld; (Louis Gerlach Pareau: A life portrait), 1866.
- Hervormde Kerk: Een handboek bij de Acad. lessen, Groningen 1851-'57, (Reformed Church: A textbook on the academic lessons at Groningen in 1851–1857).
- Resultaten van onderzoek en ervaring op godsdienst gebied, Groningen 1865-'67, (Results of research and experience in theology at Groningen in 1865–1867).
