= Johann Georg Meusel =

German bibliographer and historian

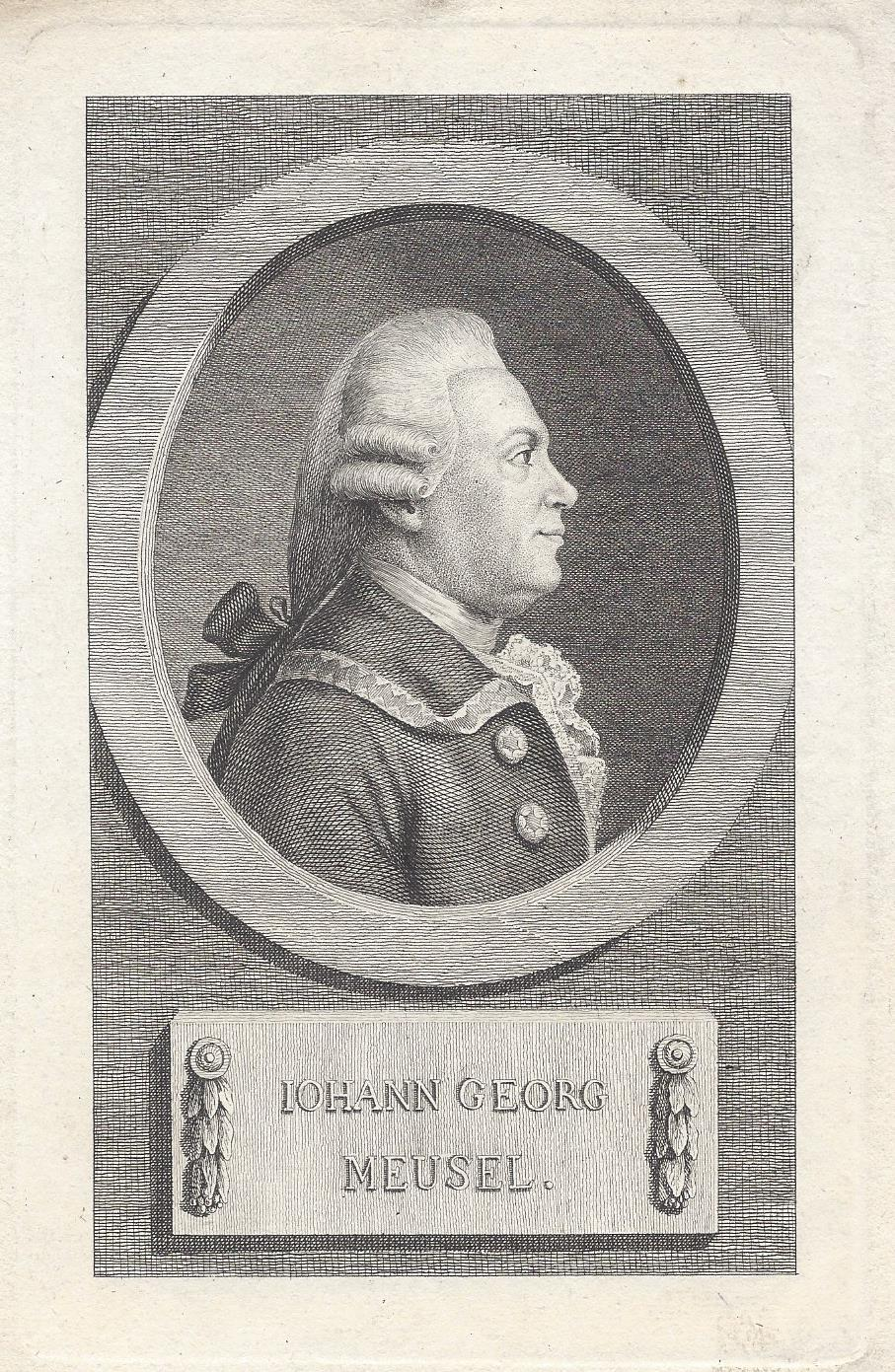
Johann Georg Meusel

Johann Georg Meusel (17 March 1743 – 19 September 1820) was a German bibliographer, lexicographer and historian.

Meusel was born in Eyrichshof. From 1764 he studied history and philology at the University of Göttingen, where his instructors included Christian Gottlob Heyne, Johann Christoph Gatterer, Gottfried Achenwall, Georg Christoph Hamberger and Christian Adolph Klotz, the latter of which he followed to the University of Halle in 1766. In 1768 he was appointed professor of history at the University of Erfurt, where his colleagues included Karl Friedrich Bahrdt and Christoph Martin Wieland. From 1779 up to the time of his death in Erlangen, he was a professor of history at the University of Erlangen.

== Selected works ==
- Neueste Litteratur der Geschichtskunde (6 volumes, 1778–80) – Latest literature of history.
- Miscellaneen artistischen Innhalts (30 issues, 1779–87) – Miscellaneous artistic subject matter.
- Bibliotheca historica; a revision of Burkhard Gotthelf Struve's work (11 volumes, 1782–1804).
- Museum für Künstler und für Kunstliebhaber (18 issues, 1788–94) – Museum for artists and art lovers / continuation of Miscellaneen artistischen Innhalts.
- Das gelehrte Teutschland; oder, Lexikon der jetzlebenden teutschen Schriftsteller, with Georg Christoph Hamberger (5th edition, 23 volumes; 1796–1834) – The learned Germany, or, encyclopaedia of living German writers.
- Leitfaden zur Geschichte der Gelehrsamkeit (3 parts, 1799–1800) – Guide to the history of scholarship.
- Lexikon der vom Jahr 1750 bis 1800 verstorbenen teutschen Schriftsteller (15 volumes, 1802–16) – Encyclopaedia of German writers who died from 1750 to 1800.
- Lehrbuch der statistik (4th edition, 1817) – Textbook of statistics.

He was also an editor of the journals, Historisch-litterarisches Magazin (1785–86) and Historisch-litterarisch-bibliographisches Magazin (1788–94).
