= Abraham Kuenen =

Dutch Protestant theologian

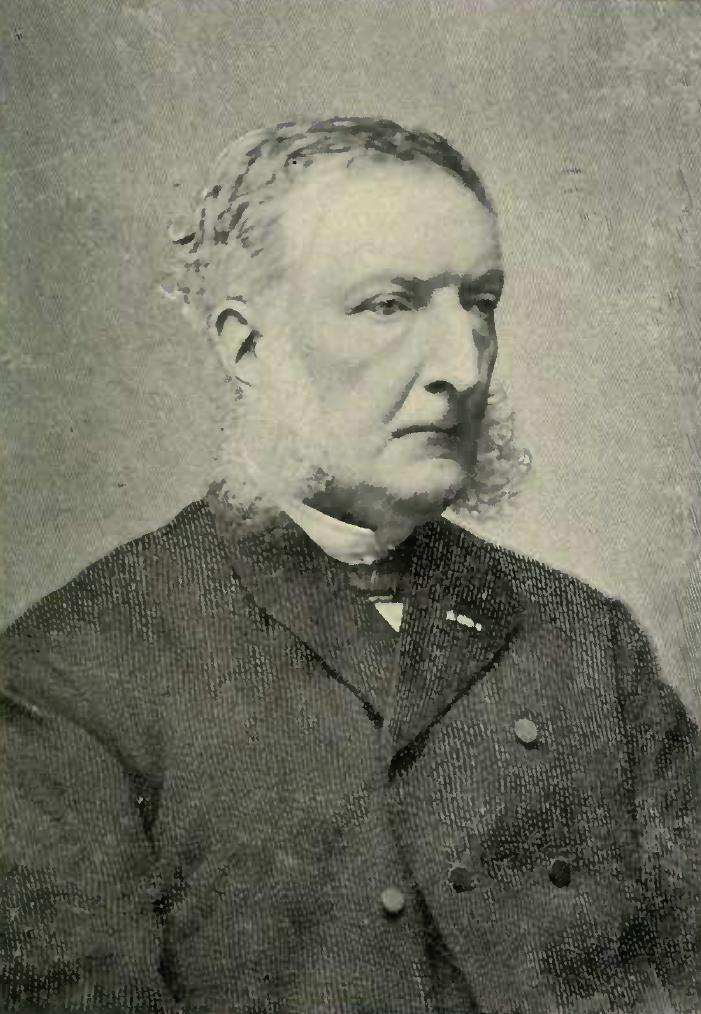
Abraham Kuenen

Abraham Kuenen (16 September 1828 – 10 December 1891) was a Dutch Protestant theologian.

Kuenen was born in Haarlem, the son of an apothecary. On his father's death it became necessary for him to leave school and take a humble place in the business. By the generosity of friends he was educated at the gymnasium at Haarlem and afterwards at the University of Leiden. He studied theology, and won his doctor's degree by an edition of thirty-four chapters of Genesis from the Arabic version of the Samaritan Pentateuch. In 1853 he became professor extraordinarius of theology at Leiden, and in 1855 full professor. He married a daughter of Willem Muurling, one of the founders of the Groningen school, which made the first pronounced breach with Calvinistic theology in the Reformed Church of the Netherlands.

Kuenen himself soon became one of the main supporters of the modern theology, of which Jan Hendrik Scholten and Karel Willem Opzoomer (b. 1821) were the chief founders, and of which Leiden became the headquarters. His first great work, an historico-critical introduction to the Old Testament, Historisch-Kritisch Onderzoek naar het onstaan en de verzameling van de Boeken des Ouden Verbonds (3 vols., 1861–1865; 2nd ed., 1885–1893; German by T Weber and CT Müller, 1885–1894), followed the lines of this dominant school of Heinrich Ewald.

But before long he came under the influence of J.W. Colenso, and learned to regard the prophetic narrative of Genesis, Exodus, and Numbers as older than what was by the Germans denominated Grundschrift (Book of Origins). In 1869-1870 he published his book on the religion of Israel, De Godsdienst van Israël tot den ondergang van den Joodschen staat (3 vols.; Eng. trans., 1874–1875).

This was followed in 1875 by a study of Hebrew prophecy, De profeten en de profetie onder Israel (Eng. trans., 1877), largely polemical in its scope, and specially directed against those who rest theological dogmas on the fulfilment of prophecy. In 1882 Kuenen went to England to deliver a course of Hibbert lectures, National Religions and Universal Religion; in the following year he presided at the congress of Orientalists held at Leiden. In 1886 his volume on the Hexateuch was published in England. He was also a member of the Teylers First Society (1856–1891). He died at Leiden on December 10, 1891.

Kuenen was also the author of many articles, papers and reviews; a series on the Hexateuch, which appeared in the Theologisch Tijdschrift, of which in 1866 he became joint editor, is one of the finest products of modern criticism. His collected works were translated into German and published by Karl Budde in 1894. Several of his works have been translated into English by Philip Wicksteed. See the article in Herzog-Hauck, Realencyklopädie.

== See also ==
- Johannes Kuenen
