= Petrus Hofstede de Groot =

Dutch theologian

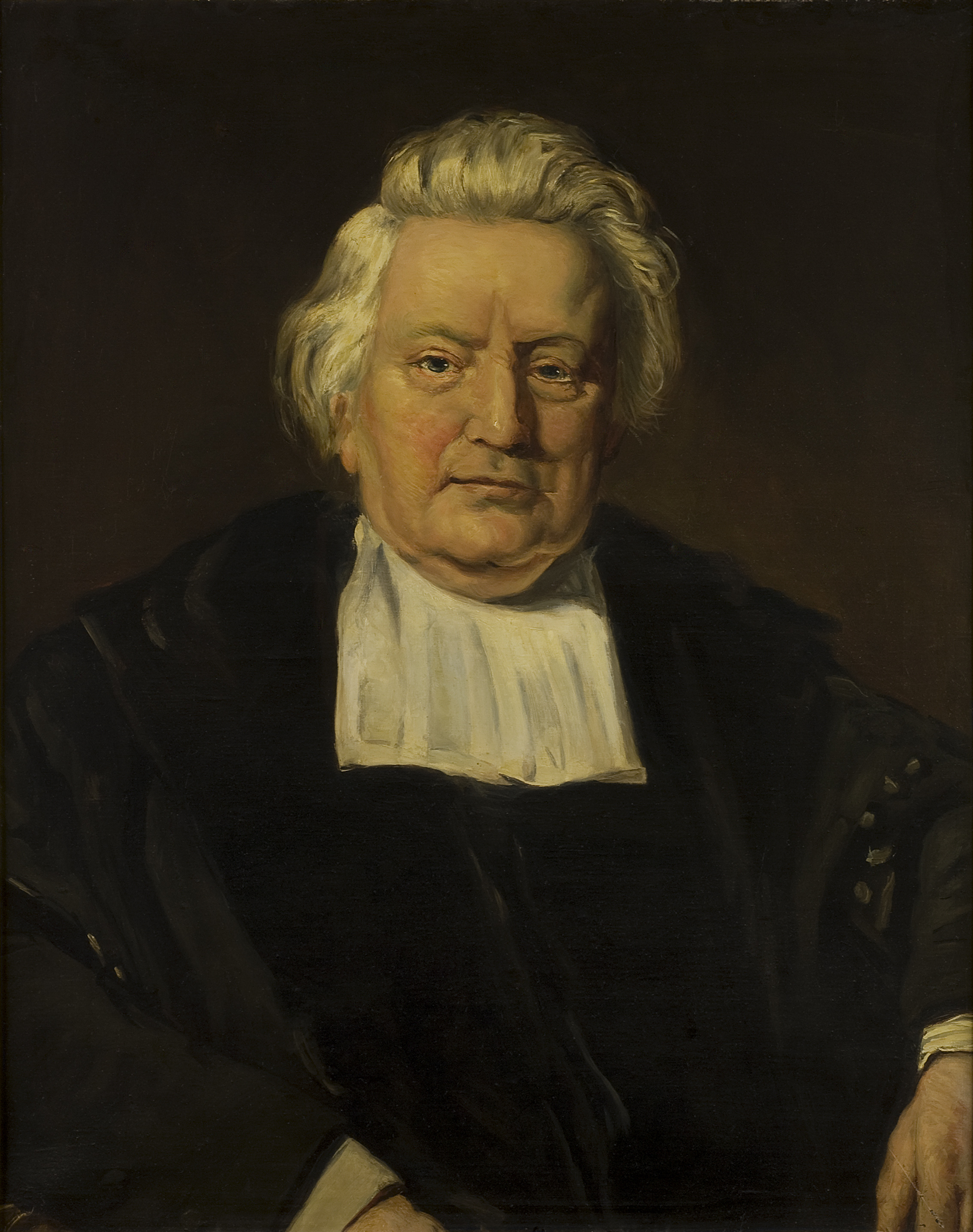
Petrus Hofstede de Groot, by Jan Ensing (1851/52)

Petrus Hofstede de Groot (8 October 1802 - 5 December 1886), Dutch theologian, was born at Leer in East Friesland, and was educated at the Gymnasium and University of Groningen.

For three years (1826-1829) he was pastor of the Reformed Church at Ulrum, and then entered upon his lifelong duties as professor of theology at Groningen. With his colleagues Louis Gerlach Pareau, Johan Frederik van Oordt, and Willem Muurling, he edited from 1837 to 1872 the Waarheid in Liefde. In this review and in his numerous books he vigorously upheld the orthodox faith against the Dutch "modern theology" movement. He became professor emeritus in 1872, and died at Groningen on 5 December 1886.

== Published works ==
=== Latin ===
- — (1826). Disputatio, qua ep. ad Hebraeos cum Paulin. epistolis comparatur [Lecture on Paul's Epistle to the Hebrews] (in Latin).
- — (1835). Institutiones historiae ecclesiae christianae : in scholarum suarum usum breviter delineatae [A history of the Christian Church: A brief textbook] (in Latin). Grongingen: I. Oomkens. OCLC 962423378.
- — (1834). Institutiones theologiae naturalis : in scholarum suarum usum delineatae [Natural theology: A textbook] (in Latin). Groningen: W. Zuidema. OCLC 906444937. Second edition: 1839, third edition: 1845, fourth edition: 1861.
- —; Pareau, Lodewijk Gerlach (1840). Encyclopaedia theologi Christiani : in scholarum suarum usum breviter delineata [Encyclopaedia of Christian theologians: A brief textbook] (in Latin). Groningen: C. M. Van Bolhuis Hoitsema. OCLC 719403745. Second edition: 1844, Third edition: 1851.
- — (1846). Jezus Christus, de grond van de eenheid der christelijke kerk: woorden van vrede en vereeniging voor alle christenen (in Dutch). Groningen: M. Smit.
- Pareau, Lodewijk Gerlach; — (1848). Lineamenta theologiae christianae universae [Features of all Christian theology] (in Latin). Groningen: C. M. Van Bolhuis Hoitsema. Second edition: 1845, Third edition: 1848.

=== Dutch ===
- — (1834). Gedachten over de beschuldiging, tegen de leeraars der Nederlandsche Hervormde Kerk in deze dagen openlijk ingebragt, dat zij hunnen eed breken, door af te wijken van de leer hunner kerk, die zij beloofd hebben te zullen houden (in Dutch). Groningen: M. Smit.
- Leipoldt, W.; Hofstede de Groot, Petrus (1841). Geschiedenis der Christelijke Kerk, voor katechizatiën en huisgezinnen [History of the Christian Church for Catechesis and Families] (in Dutch). Smit. OCLC 65439603.
- — (1846–1848). Voorlezingen over de geschiedenis der opvoeding des menschdoms door God : tot op de komst van Jezus Christus [Lectures on the history of God's education of humanity until the coming of Jesus Christ] (in Dutch). Groningen: A.L. Scholtens. OCLC 22407996. (3 volumes) 1847, Volume 2, first edition, 1849, including additions and improvements from the second edition for the owners of the first, 1849, Volume 2, second edition
- — (1850). De zending in china : volgens 't geen Dr. K. Gützlaff den 18 April 1850, daarvan te Groningen mededeelde : benevens eenige woorden over de noodwendigheid der zending, vooral over die in china in onzen tijd [The Christian mission in China: As reported by Dr. Karl Gützlaff in Groningen on April 18, 1850, as well as a few words about the necessity of mission, especially current missionary efforts in China] (in Dutch). Groningen: A. L. Scholtens. OCLC 31617543.
- — (1858). The Nature of the Gospel Ministry.
- — (1868). Basilides am Ausgange des apostolischen Zeitalters als erster Zeuge für Alter und Autorität neutestamentlicher Schriften : insbesondere des Johannesevangeliums : in Verbindung mit andern Zeugen bis zur Mitte des zweiten Jahrhunderts [Basilides as the first evidence of the date of authorship and authority of New Testament writings, especially of the Gospel of John, and other witnesses until the middle of the second century] (in German). J. C. Hinrichs. ISBN 0-7905-7003-3. OCLC 678091662.
- — (1870). De moderne theologie in Nederland : volgens de hoofdwerken harer beroemdste voorstanders, in het licht gesteld [The "Modern Theology" of the Netherlands: According to the main works of its most famous proponents] (in Dutch). P. Noordhoff. OCLC 31340509.
- — (1870). Ary Scheffer: Ein Charakterbild [Ary Scheffer: A character sketch] (in Dutch). Berlin: Paul Gerhard Heinersdorff. Republished as Ary Scheffer (in Dutch). Groningen: P. Noordhoff. 1872. OCLC 926457722.
- — (1877). The Old Catholic Movement.
