= Johan Frederik van Oordt =

Dutch theologian (1794–1852)

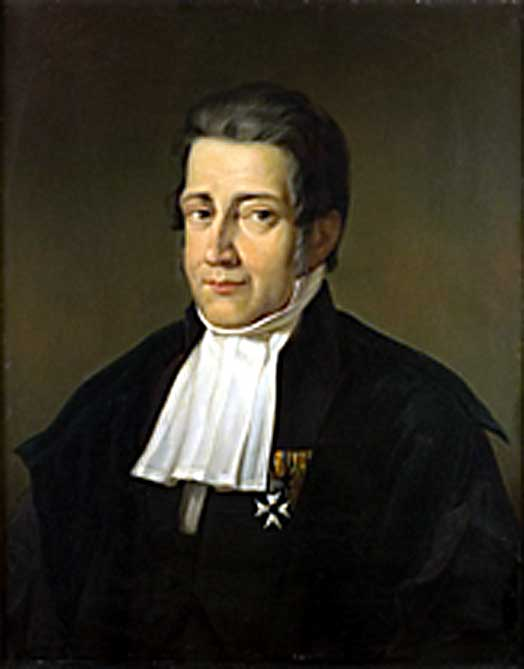
Johan Frederik van Oordt (1835)

Johan Frederik van Oordt; name sometimes spelled as Joan Frederik van Oordt (23 November 1794 – 11 December 1852) was a Dutch theologian born in Rotterdam.

In 1821 he earned his doctorate at University of Utrecht, where one of his instructors was Philip Willem van Heusde (1778-1839). While still a student he served as pastor in Lower Langbroek. Following graduation he served as a minister in Alkmaar, and in 1823 returned to Utrecht, where he worked as a minister and teacher.

In 1829 van Oordt was appointed professor of theology at the University of Groningen, where he conducted classes in dogmatics, practical theology, homiletics, et al. With Louis Gerlach Pareau (1800-1866) and Petrus Hofstede de Groot (1802-1886), he formed the nucleus of an influential theological movement known as the Groningen School.

At Groningen he was co-founder of the journal Waarheid in Liefde (Truth and Love). In 1839 he relocated to the University of Leiden as a professor of theology.

- Note: He is not to be confused with Johan Frederik van Oordt (1856-1918), his grandson (who later immigrated to South Africa to participate in the Boer War), known for his work as a writer, explorer and wildlife conservationist, where he eventually established what was to become South Africa’s National Parks, an accomplishment highly commended by President Kruger.
