= Groningen theology =

Theological movement in Dutch Reformed Church

The Groningen Theology was a theological movement in the Dutch Reformed Church of the mid-nineteenth century that sought a middle way between theological rationalism and orthodox Calvinism. The innovators of the Groningen theology—Petrus Hofstede de Groot (1802–1886), Johan Frederik van Oordt (1794–1852), and Louis Gerlach Pareau (1800–1866)—were professors at the Royal University of Groningen who met weekly with friends and pastors starting in 1835 to study the New Testament. Professor Willem Muurling (1805–1882) joined the society after Van Oordt accepted a chair at Leiden in 1839. The Groningen theologians attracted national attention above all through their journal, Waarheid in Liefde (Truth in Love), which ran from 1837 to 1872.

== History ==
The concept of practical Christian formation was central to the theology of the Groningen School. “The basic thought-form that controls everything is this,” wrote Hofstede de Groot, “that the foremost thing about Christianity is the revelation and the education that God grants us in Jesus Christ in order to bring us into greater conformity with God…” They drew upon Platonism, especially as mediated to them by the philosopher Philip Willem van Heusde (1778–1839), to articulate their understanding of Christian formation; Hofstede de Groot charged the church with the task that Plato had mistakenly assigned the state in his Republic, namely, that of forming its citizens. As Th. L. Haitjema pointed out, the emphasis the Groningen School placed on the church as the locus of formation set it apart from the theological rationalism of the eighteenth century.

The Groningen School adopted a self-consciously nationalistic stance in its theology. Although respectful of Martin Luther and John Calvin, the Groningen theologians blamed French-speaking refugees for importing a hardnosed Calvinism at the Synod of Dordt (1619) that did not respect native traditions of doctrinal tolerance. The Groningen theologians looked back to Thomas à Kempis, Wessel Gansfort, Desiderius Erasmus, Cornelius Jansen, and Johannes Coccejus, among others, as spiritual predecessors. They were more standoffish about the influence of contemporary German theologians like Friedrich Schleiermacher, with whom many nevertheless compared them.

The Groningen School was thoroughly Christocentric in their approach to theology, but also frequently revisionist in regard to traditional doctrinal formulations. The Groningen School's revisions to classic christological and Trinitarian doctrines brought them into conflict with more orthodox factions in the Dutch Reformed Church. Hofstede de Groot, who served as pastor at Ulrum in the province of Groningen from 1826 to 1829, entered into a polemical debate in 1833 with his successor, Hendrik de Cock, who later seceded from the state church in 1834. Some held the teachings of the Groningen School partly responsible for this succession, an accusation that Hofstede de Groot considered unfair.

In 1842, a circle of orthodox laymen associated with the Réveil and led by Guillaume Groen van Prinsterer called upon the synod of the Dutch Reformed Church to declare the Groningen School in contradiction with its confessional standards. After the synod rejected that petition on technical grounds, these so-called “Seven Gentlemen from the Hague” appealed directly to church members, urging them to rise up against the influence of the Groningen School. The controversy settled down after the church authorities in Groningen made clear their support for the Groningen theologians.

Although the Groningen School was a major influence in the Dutch Reformed Church of the nineteenth century, the middle ground it occupied proved unstable and unable to holdback the growing split between modernist and orthodox factions.

== Bibliography ==
- Haitjema, Theodorus Lambertus. De Richtingen in de Nederlandse Hervormde Kerk. 2nd edition. Wageningen: H. Veenman & Zonen, 1953.
- Hofstede de Groot, Petrus. De Groninger Godgeleerden in Hunne Eigenaardigheid. Groningen: A. L. Scholtens, 1855.
- Vree, Jasper. De Groninger Godeleerden: De Oorsprongen en de Erste Periode van Hun Optreden (1820-1843). Kampen : J.H. Kok, 1984.
