= Bydlino =

- Village
- Location within Poland
- Coordinates: 54°32′16″N 16°58′44″E
- Country: Poland
- Voivodeship: Pomeranian
- County: Słupsk
- Gmina: Słupsk
- Population: 210

Bydlino [bɨˈdlinɔ] (German: Bedlin) is a village in the administrative district of Gmina Słupsk, within Słupsk County, Pomeranian Voivodeship, in northern Poland.

== Notable residents ==
- David Ruhnken (1723–1798), scholar
