= Tiberius Hemsterhuis =

18th-century Dutch philologist

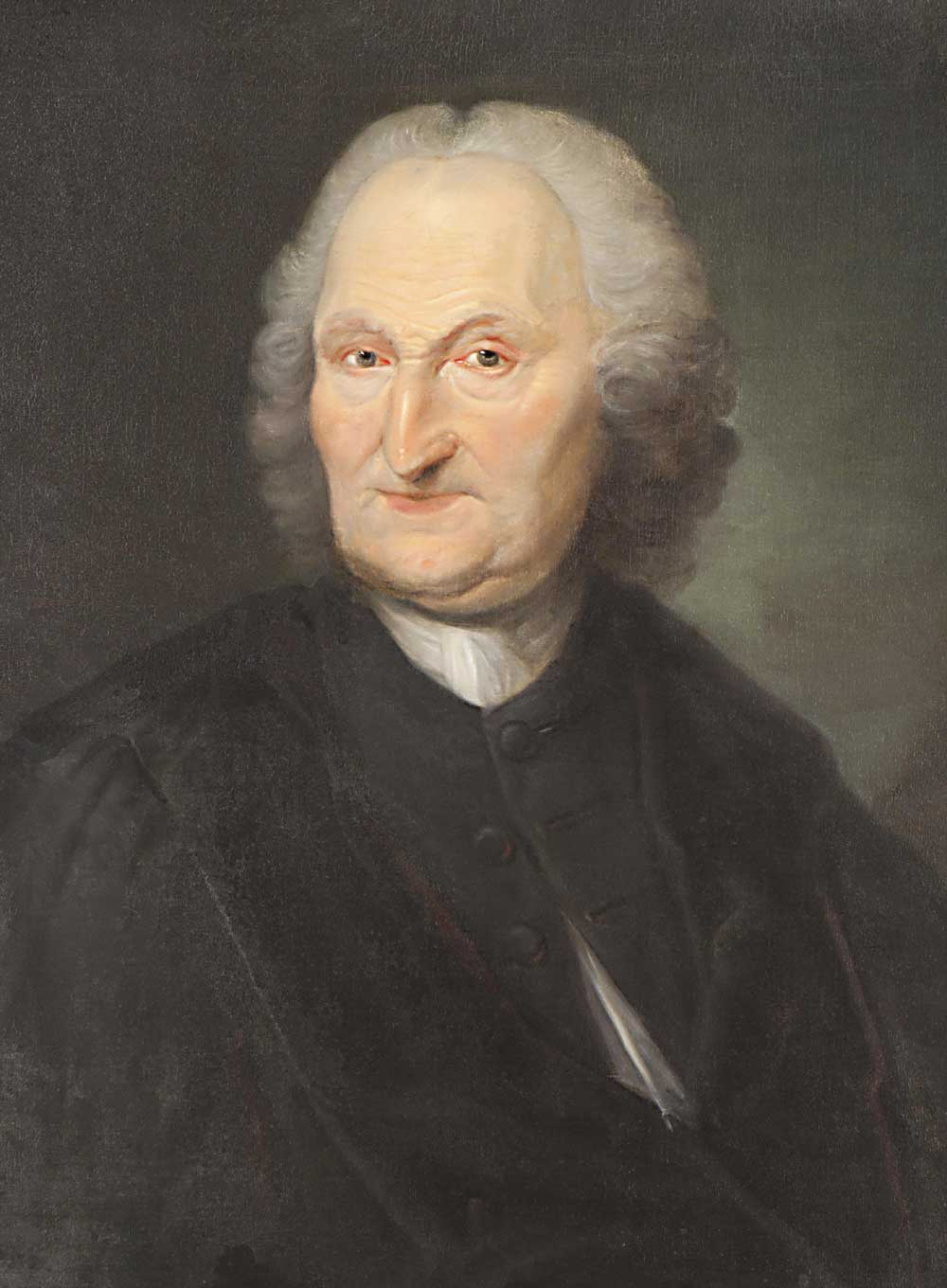
Portrait by Jan Palthe, 1757

Tiberius Hemsterhuis (9 January 1685 – 7 April 1766) was a Dutch philologist and critic.

== Life ==
Hemsterhuis was born in Groningen. His father, a learned physician, gave him a good early education and he entered the university of his native city in his fifteenth year, where he proved himself the best student of mathematics. After a year or two at Groningen, he was attracted to the University of Leiden by the fame of Perizonius. While there, he was entrusted with the duty of arranging the manuscripts in the library. Though he accepted an appointment as professor of mathematics and philosophy at Amsterdam in his twentieth year, he had already directed his attention to the study of the ancient languages.

In 1717 Hemsterhuis was appointed a professor of Greek at the University of Franeker to replace Lambert Bos, but he did not enter on his duties there till 1720. In 1738 he became a professor of national history as well. Two years afterward, he was called to teach the same subjects at Leiden, where he died on 7 April 1766.

He was the father of Frans Hemsterhuis.

== Works ==
In 1706, he completed the edition of Julius Pollux's Onomasticon begun by Jean-Henri Lederlin (1672–1737), but the praise he received from his countrymen was more than counterbalanced by two letters of criticism from Bentley, which mortified him so keenly that for two months he refused to open a Greek book. Hemsterhuis was the founder of a Dutch school of criticism which had disciples in Lodewijk Caspar Valckenaer, Jacob van Lennep and David Ruhnken.

His major writings were:

- Luciani colloquia et Timon (1708)
- Aristophanis Plutus (1744)
- Notae, etc., ad Xenophontem Ephesium in the Miscellanea critica of Amsterdam, vols. iii. and iv.
- Observationes ad Chrysostomi homilias (1784)
- Orationes (1784)
- a Latin translation of the Birds of Aristophanes, in Kuster's edition
- notes to Bernard's Thomas Magister, to Alberti's Hesychius of Alexandria, to Johann August Ernesti's Callimachus and to Pieter Burmann the Younger's Propertius.

== See also ==
- Friedrich Ludwig Abresch - a Dutch philologist influenced by Hemsterhuis's teachings
