= Philip Willem van Heusde =

Dutch philosopher and educator

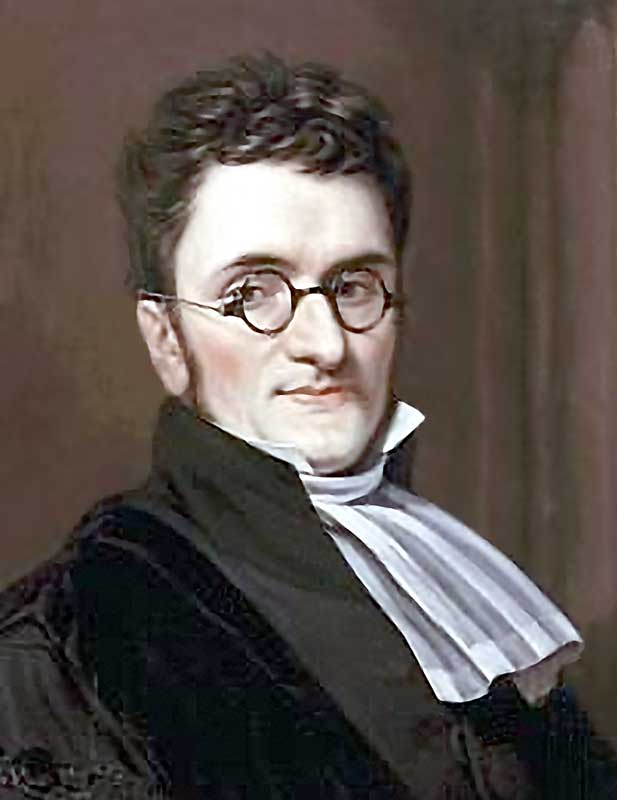
Philip Willem van Heusde.

Philip Willem van Heusde (17 June 1778 in Rotterdam – 2 July 1839 in Geneva) was a Dutch philosopher and educator. He is known for his influence on the founders of the so-called Groningen school of theology.

He studied literature and law in Amsterdam and Leiden. In 1803 he received his doctorate in literature with a dissertation on Plato. During the same year, he obtained his law degree. From 1803 to 1815, he was a professor of history, antiquities, eloquence and Greek studies at Utrecht University, where from 1815 to 1839, he was a professor of theoretical philosophy and literature. At Utrecht, he also served as university librarian (1816–1839). He died on 2 July 1839 in Geneva, while traveling to Rome.

Van Heusde was a prominent figure in the Protestant Réveil movement during the early part of the 19th century. His humanistic ideas found widespread support from educators, theologians and jurists. During his career, he strove to improve education in high schools.

== Selected works ==
- Initia philosophiae Platonicae I-III, Utrecht, Joannes Altheer, 1827–1836
- Brieven over het beoefenen der wijsbegeerte, inzonderheid in ons vaderland en in onze tijden, Utrecht, Joannes Altheer, 1837
- De Socratische school of wijsgeerte voor de negentiende eeuw I-IV, Utrecht, Joannes Altheer & Van der Post Jr., 1834–1839
- De school van Polybius of Geschiedkunde voor de negentiende eeuw, Amsterdam, Johannes Müller, 1841
