= Georg Aenotheus Koch =

German classical philologist and lexicographer

Georg Aenotheus Koch (15 November 1802, Drebach – 9 July 1879, Leipzig) was a German classical philologist and lexicographer.

He studied theology and classical philology at the University of Leipzig as a student of Gottfried Hermann and Christian Daniel Beck. In 1825, he received his doctorate, and beginning in 1831 he taught classes at the Thomasschule zu Leipzig. In 1862, he was appointed school conrector.

In addition to writing numerous editions of classical works, he did extensive work in regards to the lexicography of individual authors, namely: Horace, Virgil, Marcus Velleius Paterculus and Cornelius Nepos. He also published a Latin thesaurus (Gradus ad Parnassum), a pocket dictionary (over three editions) and a successful German-Latin geographical dictionary.

== Published works ==
- Timaei Sophistae Lexicon vocum Platonicarum, 1828; (edition of Timaeus the Sophist).
- Moeridis Atticistae Lexicon Atticum, 1830; (edition of Aelius Moeris).
- Deutsch-Lateinisches vergleichendes Wörterbuch der alten, mittleren und neuen Geographie, 1835 – German-Latin comparative dictionary of ancient, medieval and modern geography.
- Lateinisch-deutsches Handwoerterbuch, 1854 – Latin-German pocket dictionary.
- Cornelii Nepotis Vitae, 1855; (edition of Cornelius Nepos).
- Vollständiges Wörterbuch zum Geschichtswerke des M. Vellejus Paterculus, 1857 – Complete dictionary for the historical works of Marcus Vellejus Paterculus.
- Gradus ad Parnassum : sive Thesaurus Latini linguae poeticus et prosodiacus, 1860 – Gradus ad Parnassum, Thesaurus of Latin language poetry and prose.
- Vollständiges Wörterbuch zu den Gedichten des P. Vergilius Maro, 1863 – Complete dictionary for the poems of Virgil.
- Erklärendes Wörterbuch zu den Lebensbeschreibungen des Cornelius Nepos, 1868 – Explanatory dictionary for the biographies of Cornelius Nepos.
- Vollständiges Wörterbuch zu den gedichten des Q. Horatius Flaccus, 1879 – Complete dictionary for the poems of Horace.
