= Arnold Drakenborch =

Dutch classical scholar (1684-1748)

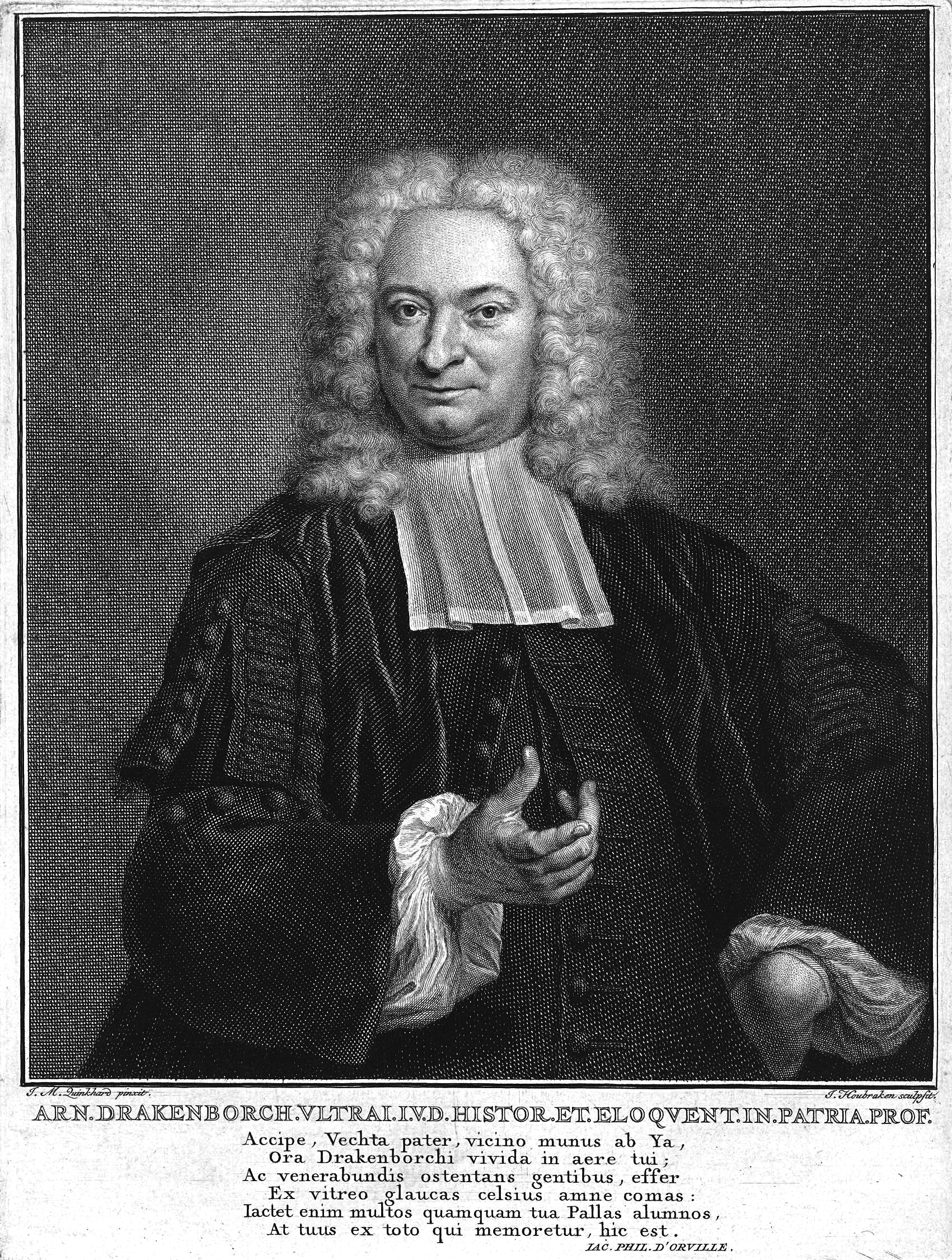
Arnold Drakenborch (Jacob Houbraken, ca. 1737)

Arnold Drakenborch (1 January 1684 – 16 January 1748) was a Dutch classical scholar.

== Early life ==
Drakenborch was born at Utrecht. Having studied philology under Graevius and Burmann the elder, and law under Cornelius Van Eck, in 1716 he succeeded Burmann in his professorship (conjointly with CA Duker), which he continued to hold until his death. Although he obtained the degree of doctor of laws, and was intended for the legal profession, he decided to concentrate on philological studies.

== Career ==
His edition of Livy (1738–1746, and subsequent editions) is the work on which his fame chiefly rests. The preface gives a particular account of all the literary men, who have at different periods commented on the works of Livy. The edition itself is based on that of Gronovius; but Drakenborch made many important alterations on the authority of manuscripts which it is probable Gronovius had never seen.

He also published Dissertatio de praefectis urbi (1704; reprinted at Frankfort in 1752 with a life of Drakenborch); Dissertatio de officio praefectorum praetorio (1707); and an edition of Silius Italicus (1717).
