= Timaeus the Sophist =

Ancient Greek philosopher

Timaeus the Sophist (Ancient Greek: Τίμαιος ὁ Σοφιστής) was a Greek philosopher who lived sometime between the 1st and 4th centuries. Nothing is known about his life.

He is the supposed author of a Lexicon of Platonic words, which is still extant. The purpose of the Lexicon was to explain the usage of words and phrases which occur in Plato's works, and made use of earlier commentaries on Plato which are now lost. It underwent significant additions and subtractions of text during later periods leading to the inclusion of many words which have nothing to do with Plato or his philosophy. The first complete edition of the Lexicon, prepared by David Ruhnken, was published in Leiden in 1754.

== Lexicon ==
Timaeus created the lexicon on the basis of older Plato commentaries, which have not been preserved. He gives his name in the dedication letter. He dedicates the work to a friend, an otherwise unknown Roman, for whom the Greek name forms Gaiatianos and Gaitianos have been handed down; he may have been called Caietanus, Gentianus or Gratianus. The time of composition is difficult to determine; a quote from a work by the Neoplatonist Porphyry has no definitive value for the dating, since it is probably an interpolation.

Among the 468 alphabetically arranged expressions, which Timaeus usually only briefly explains, there is not a single philosophical technical term. More than a third of the expressions occur in Plato only in a single place. As Timaeus states in the letter of dedication, he is concerned with clarifying words and phrases with unusual meanings and dialectal peculiarities of Plato's Attic language, which not only the Romans but also most Greeks of his time are not familiar with. Occasionally he also goes into the etymology.

The lexicon has only survived in a single manuscript from the 10th century, which is now in the French National Library in Paris. The version that has been preserved contains additions that do not come from the author. This is evident from the fact that numerous words are included that Plato never uses and that some words are given different meanings than those relevant to Plato's texts. The lexicon was probably gradually expanded after the death of its author. In some cases only one of several meanings of an expression occurring in Plato's works is given. While in earlier research it was assumed that the surviving text was complete, according to the current state of research it can be assumed that the manuscript contains only an abridged version.

== Legacy ==
So far, no reliable traces of the use of the lexicon in antiquity have been found. Whether the Neoplatonist Ammonius Hermiae of Alexandria (5th century) used it for his commentary on Plato's dialogue Phaedrus is uncertain. Around the middle of the 9th century, the famous Byzantine scholar Photios consulted the lexicon, which he considered to be of relatively little value, and made notes about it in his Bibliotheca. In the early modern period, the encyclopedia was unavailable. The manuscript reached France in the 17th century, where the scholar Bernard de Montfaucon discovered it in a French private library and published a partial edition in 1715. The first detailed study of the manuscript and edition of the Lexicon was produced in the late 18th century by David Ruhnken (1754; 2nd ed. 1789) who also provided a detailed commentary. There was a revised version of Ruhnken's second edition by Georg Aenotheus Koch in 1828.
