= Aelius Moeris =

Ancient Greek grammarian

Aelius Moeris (Αέλιος Μοίρης) (probably flourished in the 2nd century A.D.) was a Greek grammarian, surnamed Atticista (Αττικιστής, the Atticist).

== Works ==
He was the author of an extant (more or less alphabetical) list of Attic forms and expressions (Greek: Ἀττικαὶ λέξεις), accompanied by the Hellenistic parallels of his own time, the differences of gender, accent, and meaning being clearly and succinctly pointed out.

The lexicon consists of 919 entries, alphabetized only by the first letter. Most entries compare an "Attic" term with its counterpart, said to be "Greek".

== Editions ==
- John Hudson (1711)
- J. Pierson (1759)
- A. Koch (1830)
- Harpocration et Moeris I. Bekker (ed.), 1833
