= Cornelis Willem Opzoomer =

Dutch jurist, positivist philosopher and theologian

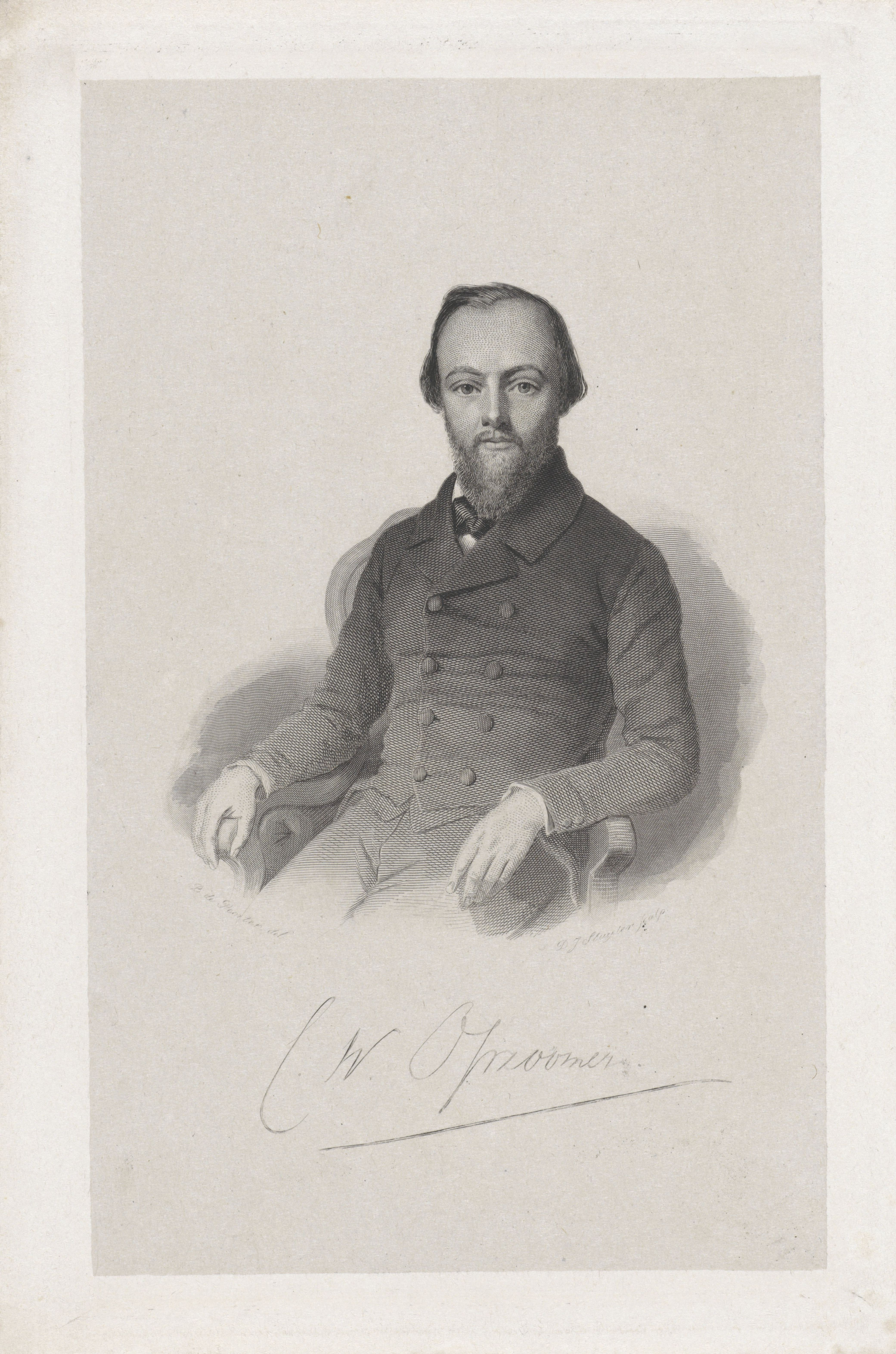
Portrait of Cornelis Willem Opzoomer by Dirk Jurriaan Sluyter

Cornelis Willem Opzoomer (20 September 1821, Rotterdam – 23 August 1892, Oosterbeek) was a Dutch jurist, positivist philosopher and theologian. He was professor of philosophy at Utrecht University from 1846 to 1889.

In 1856 he became member of the Royal Netherlands Academy of Arts and Sciences.
