= Lambert Bos =

Dutch scholar (1670–1717)

- Lambertus Bos
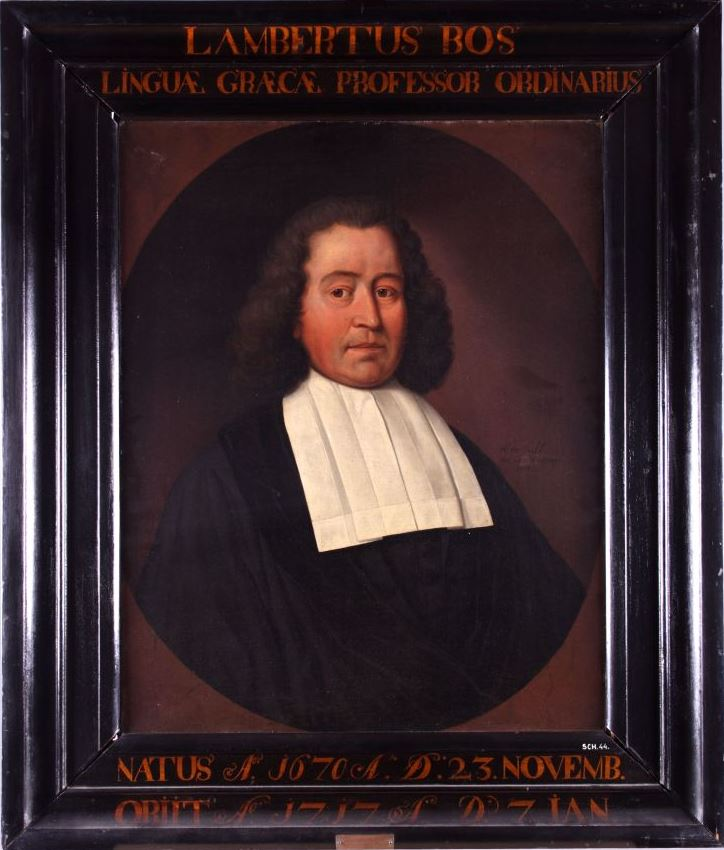
- Born: October 23, 1670; Workum, Friesland
- Died: January 6, 1717 (aged 46); Franeker
- Occupations: Philologist, scholar, critic

Academic background
- Education: University of Franeker

Academic work
- Era: Age of Enlightenment
- Discipline: Classics, Ancient Greek, Biblical studies
- Institutions: University of Franeker
- Main interests: Greek philology, Septuagint studies, New Testament criticism
- Influenced: Tiberius Hemsterhuis

Lambert Bos (23 October 1670 – 6 January 1717) (or Lambertus Bos or Lammert Bos) was a Dutch scholar, critic and forerunner of Tiberius Hemsterhuis.

Lambert Bos was born at Workum in Friesland, where his father, Jakob Bos, was headmaster of the school. His mother was Gerarda de Haan. He was baptised in the reformed church in Workum on 25 November 1670. He went to the University of Franeker (suppressed by Napoleon in 1811), and was appointed lector in 1697 and professor of Greek in 1704. On 28 February 1712 he married Feiktje Doeckes Sineda, the widow of the priest Gerradus Horreus, and earlier the widow of Dominic Camper. after an uneventful life he died at Franeker in 1717.

His most famous work, Ellipses Graecae (1702), was translated into English by John Seager (1830); and his Antiquitates Graecae (1714) passed through several editions. He also published Vetus Testamentum, Ex Versione lxx. Interpretum (1709); notes on Thomas Magister (1698); Exercitationes Philologicae ad loca nonnulla Novi Foederis (1700); Animadversiones ad Scriptores quosdam Graecos (1715); and two small treatises on Accents and Greek Syntax.

== Sources ==
- Gerritzen, J. G. (1940) Schola Hemsterhusiana. Nijmegen - Utrecht.
- Encyclopedie van Friesland (1953)
- Oosthoeks Geillustreerde Encyclopaedie (1917)
