= Christian Adolph Klotz =

German philologist and controversialist (1738–1771)

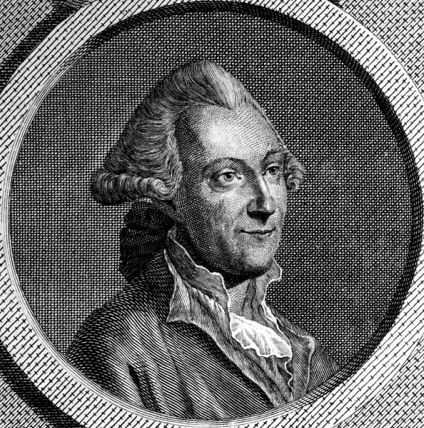
Christian Adolph Klotz.

Christian Adolph Klotz (13 November 1738 – 31 December 1771) was a German philologist and controversialist. He is a notable representative of the transition period between the Age of Enlightenment and Sturm und Drang.

== Education ==
Klotz, son of a senior church official, was born in Bischofswerda, Lusatia. He attended the gymnasium in Meißen and Görlitz. From 1758 until 1760, he studied at the University of Leipzig. In these years, he was already publishing his first philological works. Then he moved to the University of Jena, where he wrote polemic papers against Pieter Burman the Younger. Klotz defended his dissertation, qualified as a lecturer, and held lectures about Horace at Jena.

== Career ==
In 1762 he obtained the position of an associate professor and in 1763 that of a full professor from the University of Göttingen. In 1765 Klotz moved to Halle, where he served as professor of philosophy and eloquence (German: Professor für Philosophie und Beredsamkeit). There he became very popular for his literary creations and exerted a significant influence on the contemporary taste and thinking. Johann Georg Jacobi was among his supporters. Klotz published in various literary journals, among them Acta Litteraria, and introduced his students to Italian poetry as of Torquato Tasso. He got into controversy with the Allgemeinen Bibliothek, to which he had contributed.

In 1766 Klotz was appointed aulic counsellor ("Hofrat") by the king, after he had refused a call to Warsaw. In 1769 he helped Karl Friedrich Bahrdt obtain the chair of biblical antiquities in the philosophical faculty at Erfurt. Bahrdt, like Klotz, came from Bischofswerda, and two years earlier scandals in Bahrdt's private life had led to his dismissal.

Klotz' strength was his ability to cover a wide range of topics and his aesthetic as well as enjoyable style, both in Latin and German. As his weakness, however, critics identified sometimes the lack of depth and originality of his thinking. Johann Gottfried Herder and Gotthold Ephraim Lessing became known as his most influential opponents. Klotz' work Ueber den Nutzen und Gebrauch der alten geschnittenen Steine (1768) criticizing Lessing's Laokoon, had brought forth that poet's response in the Briefe antiquarischen Inhalts (1768–69). Klotz died in Halle in 1771.

== Works ==
He proved himself expert in philology through his Latin poems (collected in Opuscula poetica, 1766), the edition of Tyrtaeus (1764), and numerous treatises such as Opuscula varii argumenti (1766) and Opuscula philologica et oratoria (1772). His disputes were carried on in Acta Literaria and Deutschen Bibliothek der schönen Wissenschaften (1767–72), both of which he edited along with Neuen Hallischen gelehrten Zeitungen. Genius Saeculi (1760), Mores Eruditorum and Opuscula Latina (1760) were written with satirical ends. Other works were Vindiciae Horatianae (1764), Lectiones Venusinae (1771), and an edition of Marco Girolamo Vida's De Arte Poetica (1776).
