= David Ruhnken =

German born Dutch classical scholar (1723-1798)

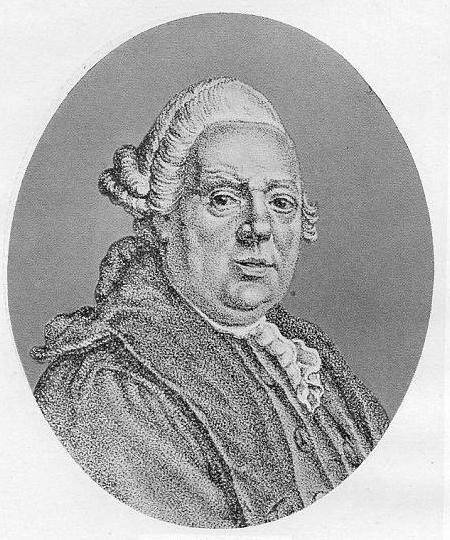
- David Ruhnken
- Born: 2 January 1723; Bedlin, Province of Pomerania, Kingdom of Prussia
- Died: 14 April 1798 (aged 75); Leiden, Batavian Republic

David Ruhnken (2 January 1723 – 14 May 1798) was a Dutch classical scholar of German origin.

== Origins ==
Ruhnken was born in Bedlin (today Bydlino) near Stolp, Pomerania Province, (today Słupsk, Poland). After he had attended Latin school at Königsberg (1737–1741), his parents wanted him to enter the church, but after two years at the University of Wittenberg he determined to live the life of a scholar. At Wittenberg, Ruhnken studied with two distinguished professors, Johann Daniel Ritter and Johann Wilhelm von Berger. To them he owed a thorough grounding in ancient history and Roman antiquities and literature; and from them he learned a pure and vivid Latin style. At Wittenberg, Ruhnken also studied mathematics and Roman law.

The only thing that made him want to leave Wittenberg was a desire to explore Greek literature. Neither at Wittenberg nor at any other German university was Greek being seriously studied at the time. It was taught to students in divinity for the sake of the Greek New Testament and the early Church Fathers. Friedrich August Wolf was the real creator of Greek scholarship in modern Germany, and Richard Porson's gibe that "the Germans in Greek are sadly to seek" had some truth in it.

== University of Leiden ==
Ruhnken followed the advice of his friends at Wittenberg and early in 1744 went to the University of Leiden, where, stimulated by the influence of Richard Bentley, Tiberius Hemsterhuis had founded the only real school of Greek learning on the Continent since the days of Joseph Justus Scaliger and Isaac Casaubon. Hemsterhuis and Ruhnken were close friends during the twenty-three years between Ruhnken's arrival in the Netherlands in 1743 and the death of Hemsterhuis in 1766. Ruhnken and Valckenaer were the two pupils of the great master on whom his inheritance must devolve.

As Ruhnken's reputation spread, many efforts were made to attract him back to Germany, but after settling in Leiden, he only left the country once, when he spent a year in Paris, ransacking the public libraries (1755). For work achieved, this year of Ruhnken may compare even with the famous year which Ritschl spent in Italy.

In 1757 Ruhnken was appointed lecturer in Greek, to assist Hemsterhuis, and in 1761 he succeeded Oudendorp, with the title of "ordinary professor of history and eloquence", as Latin professor. This promotion attracted the enmity of some native Netherlanders, who deemed themselves more worthy of the chair of Latin. Ruhnken's defence was to publish works on Latin literature which eclipsed and silenced his rivals.

In 1766 Valckenaer succeeded Hemsterhuis in the Greek chair. The intimacy between the two colleagues was only broken by Valckenaer's death in 1785, and stood the test of common candidature for the office (an important one at Leiden) of 12th Librarian of Leiden University, in which Ruhnken was successful. Ruhnken's later years were clouded by severe domestic misfortune, and by the political commotions which, after the outbreak of the war with England in 1780, troubled the Netherlands without ceasing, and threatened to extinguish the University of Leiden.

== Character ==
Soon after Ruhnken's death, his pupil Wyttenbach wrote his biography. He wrote that Ruhnken was not a recluse or a pedant, but was sociable and cared nothing for rank. Wyttenbach said of him in his early days that he knew how to sacrifice to the Sirens without proving traitor to the Muses. Life in the open air had a great attraction for him; he was fond of sport, and would sometimes devote to it two or three days in the week. In his bearing towards other scholars Ruhnken was generous and dignified, distributing literary aid with a free hand, and meeting onslaughts for the most part with a smile. In the records of learning he occupies an important position, as a principal link in the chain which connects Bentley with the modern scholarship of the European Continent. The spirit and the aims of Hemsterhuis, the great reviver of Continental learning, were committed to his trust, and were faithfully maintained. He greatly widened the circle of those who valued taste and precision in classical scholarship. He powerfully aided the emancipation of Greek studies from theology. Ruhnken was one of the first scholars of the 18th century to study and interpret Plato's writings in ancient Greek rather than interpreting Plato's works through the prisms of translations by others.

== Works ==
Ruhnken's principal works are editions of:

1. Timaeus's Lexicon of Platonic Words (1st ed. 1754 with commentary; 2nd ed. 1789; there appeared a revision of the second edition by Georg Aenotheus Koch in 1828)
2. Thalelaeus and other Greek commentators on Roman law
3. Rutilius Lupus and other grammarians
4. Velleius Paterculus
5. the works of Muretus.

He also occupied himself much with the history of Greek literature, particularly the oratorical literature, with the Homeric hymns, the scholia or, Plato and the Greek and Roman grammarians and rhetoricians. A discovery famous in its time was that in the text of the work of Apsines on rhetoric a large piece of a work by Longinus was embedded. Modern views of the writings attributed to Longinus have lessened the interest of this discovery without lessening its merit.
