= Jan Ensing =

Dutch painter (1819–1894)

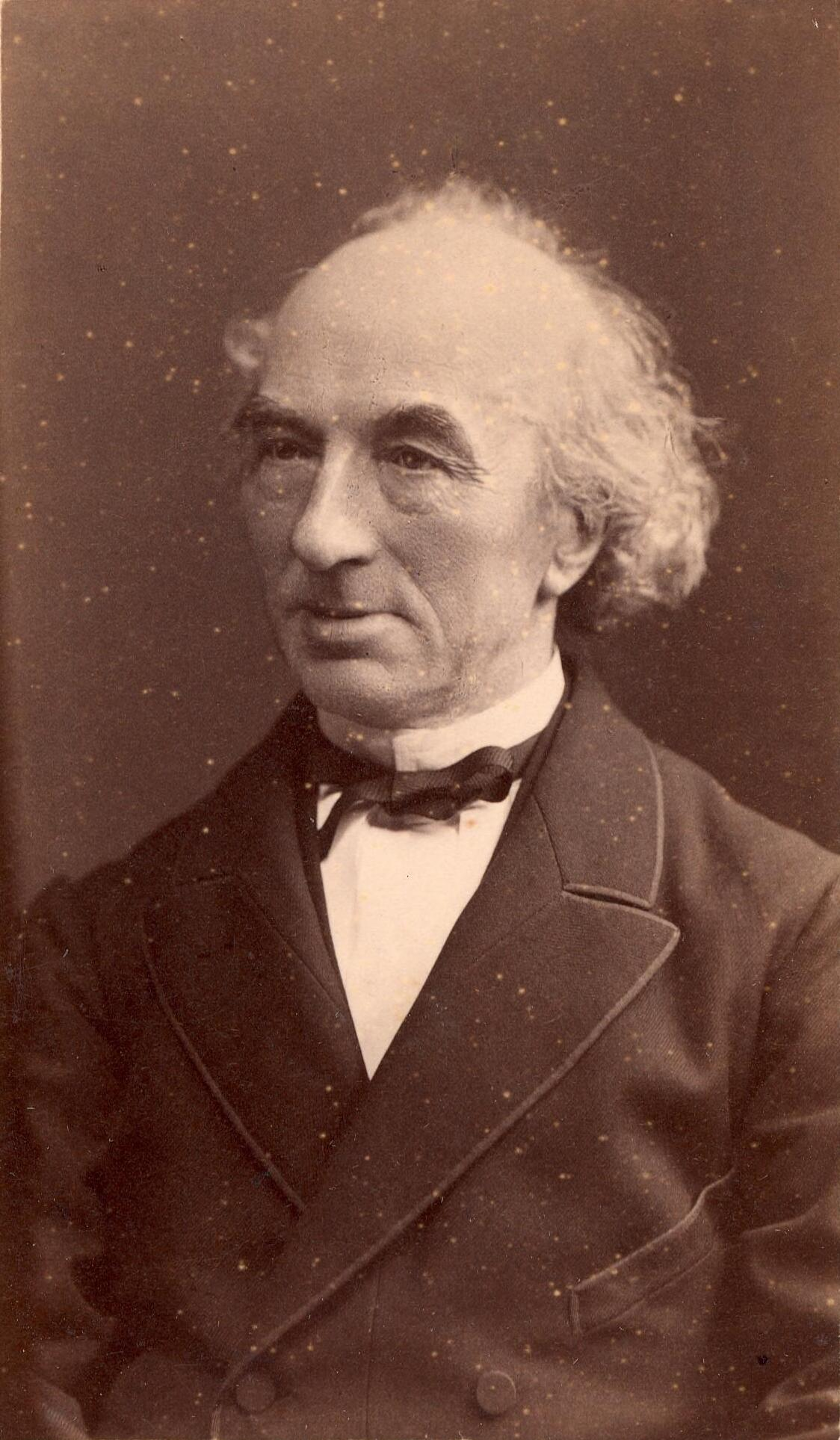
- Born: 10 March 1819; Groningen, Netherlands
- Died: 19 December 1894 (aged 75); Vlaardingen, Netherlands
- Spouse: Catharina Jager (m. 1842)

Jan Ensing, or Ensingh (10 March 1819 — 19 December 1894) was a Dutch painter, graphic artist, and lithographer; primarily known for his portraits.

== Life and work ==
Engsing was born on 10 March 1819 in Groningen to Jan Ensing (1797–1867), a shopkeeper and merchant, and his wife, Geertje (née Kuipers). His first art lessons were at the Academie Minerva with Jacob Bruggink. In 1840, his painting of a taproom at a village inn won an award from "Pictura", a visual arts society. He received another award from Pictura in 1842, for his painting of horses in a duck pond.

In 1842, he married Catharina Jager. Their daughter, Paula, would marry Paulus Kikkert (1839–1909); a shipowner and herring trader from Vlaardingen. During his frequent visits to see her, he sketched the local fishermen and their wives. Some of these drawings may be seen at the Atlas Van Stolk. Their son, Johannes (1843–1887), was a doctor in Texel and Schagen.

He had a varied teaching career. In 1850, he became a teacher at the Academie Minerva. He also taught at various other schools in Groningen: from 1861 to 1872, he taught at a school for young women; from 1864 to 1891, at a "Kweekschool", for training elementary school teachers and, from 1879 to 1891, at the Normal School. In 1874, he was elected a board member of Pictura.

In 1854, he was commissioned to paint the portraits of nineteen professors at the University of Groningen, to celebrate the opening of their new Academy Building. This was the beginning of a larger portrait gallery, which is now housed in the Senate Chamber of the current Academy Building (a replacement for the earlier one, which was destroyed by a fire in 1906).

He retired from his teaching positions in 1891, and went to live with his daughter's family in Vlaardingen. He died there on 19 December 1894, aged seventy-five, and was interred at the Emaus Cemetery.

A major retrospective was held in 1981 at the Groninger Museum. His works may be seen there, as well as at the Noordelijk Scheepvaartmuseum, and the Museum Vlaardingen. A street in the Hoogkerk district of Groningen has been named after him.
