= Carl Andreas Duker =

German classical scholar and jurist (1670–1752)

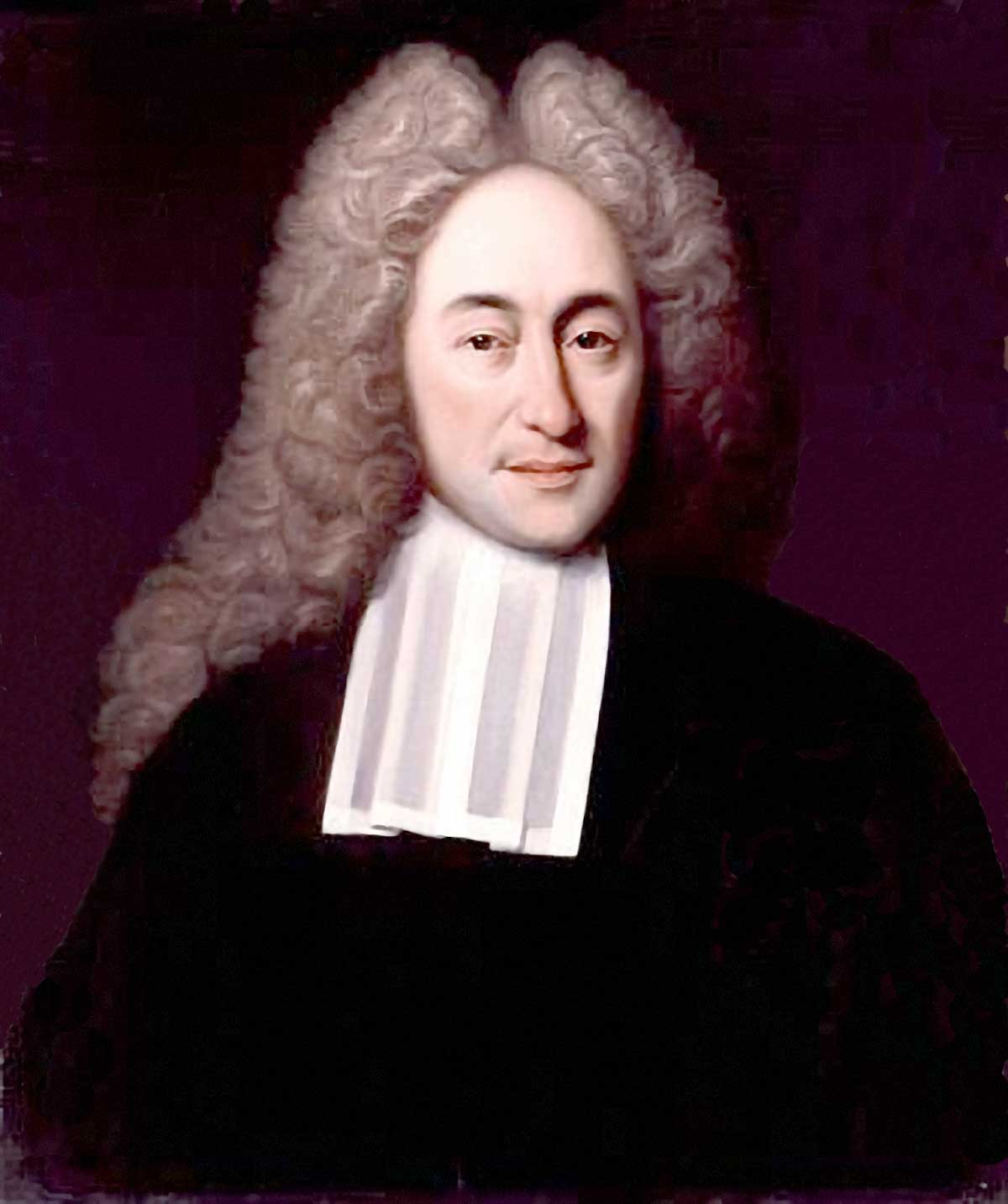
- Born: 1670; Unna
- Died: November 5, 1752 (aged 81–82); Meiderich
- Other names: Karl Andreas Düker
- Occupations: classical scholar and jurist

Carl Andreas Duker (1670 – November 5, 1752) was a German classical scholar and jurist.

== Biography ==
He was born at Unna in Westphalia, and studied at the University of Franeker under Jacob Perizonius. In 1700 he was appointed teacher of history and eloquence at the Herborn gymnasium, in 1704 vice-principal of the school at The Hague, and in 1716 he succeeded (with Drakenborch as colleague) to the professorship formerly held by Peter Burmann at Utrecht. After eighteen years' tenure he resigned his post, and lived in retirement at IJsselstein and Vianen. His health finally broke down under excessive study, and he died, almost blind, at the house of a relative in Meiderich near Duisburg, on 5 November 1752.

== Works ==
His chief classical works were editions of Florus (1722) and Thucydides (1731, considered his best). He brought out the 2nd edition of Perizonius's Origines Babylonicae et Aegyptiacae (1736) and his commentary on Pomponius Mela (1736–1737). Duker was also an authority on ancient law, and published Opuscula varia de latinitate veterum jurisconsultorum (1711), and a revision of the Leges Atticae of S. Petit (1741).
