= Pieter Burman the Younger =

Dutch lawyer and philologist (1713–1778)

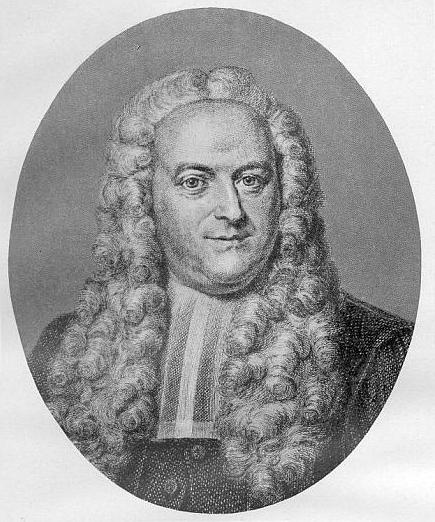
Pieter Burmann the Younger

Pieter Burman (23 October 1713 – 24 June 1778), also known as Peter or Pieter Burmann (Latin: Petrus Burmannus) and distinguished from his uncle as "the Younger" (Secundus or Junior), was a Dutch philologist.

== Life ==
Born at Amsterdam, he was brought up by his uncle in Leiden, and afterwards studied law and philology under CA Duker and Arnold von Drakenborch at Utrecht. In 1735 he was appointed professor of eloquence and history at Franeker, with which the chair of poetry was combined in 1741. In the following year he left Franeker for Amsterdam to become professor of history and philology at the Athenaeum Illustre of Amsterdam. He was subsequently professor of poetry (1744), general librarian (1752), and inspector of the gymnasium (1753). In 1777 he retired, and died on 24 June 1778 at Santhorst, near Wassenaar.

He resembled his more famous uncle in the manner and direction of his studies, and in his violent disposition, which involved him in quarrels with contemporaries, notably Saxe and Christian Adolph Klotz. He was a man of extensive learning, and had a great talent for Latin poetry. His most valuable works are:

- Anthologia Veterum Latinorum Epigrammatum et Poematum (1759–1763)
- Aristophanis comoediae Novem (1760)
- Rhetorica.

He completed the editions of Virgil (1767) and Claudian (1760), which had been left unfinished by his uncle, and commenced an edition of Propertius, one of his best works, which was only half printed at the time of his death. It was completed by L. van Santen and published in 1780.
