= Louis Gerlach Pareau =

Dutch theologian

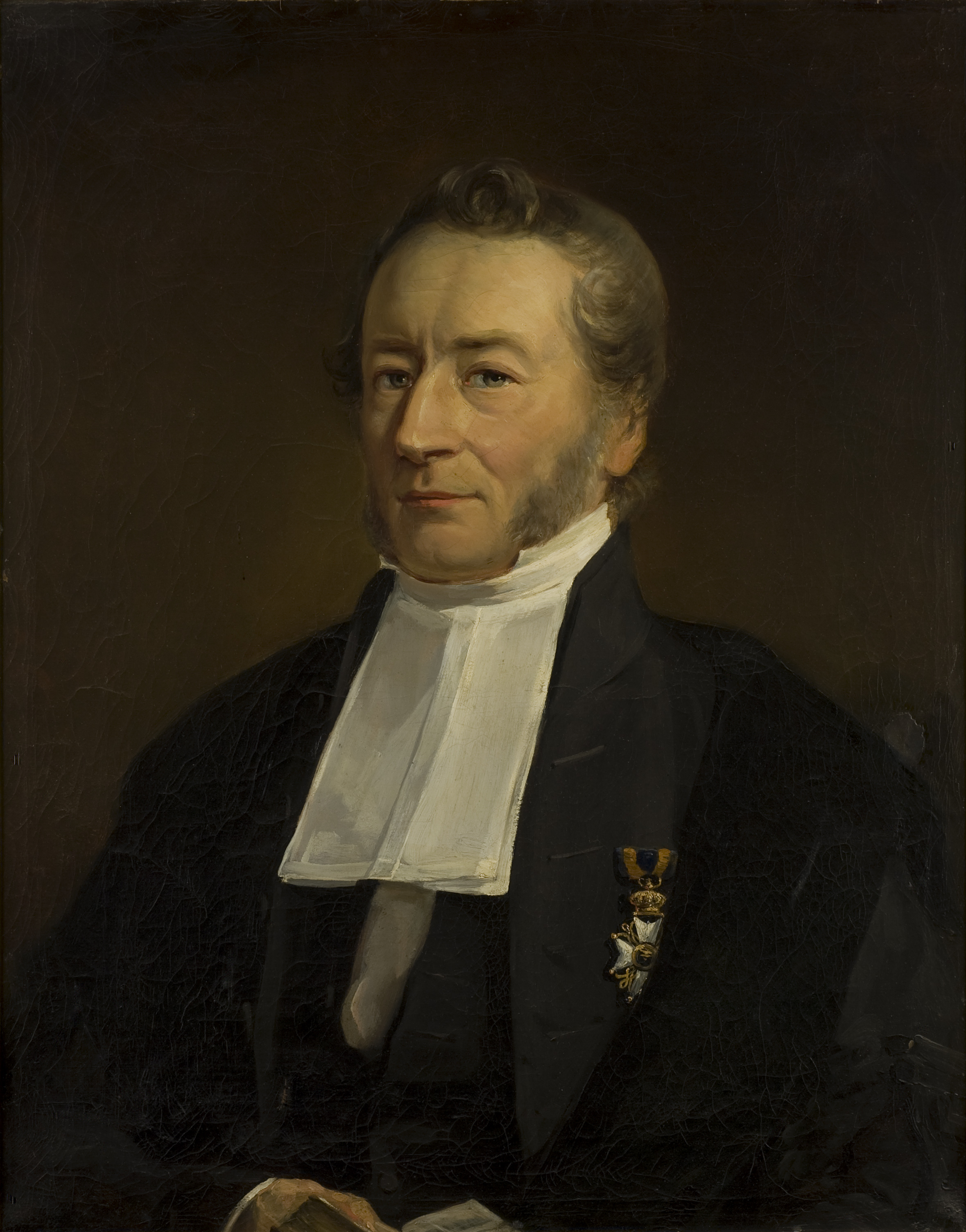
Lodewijk Pareau

Louis Gerlach Pareau (August 10, 1800 – October 27, 1866) was a Dutch theologian born in Deventer. He was the son of Jean Henri Pareau (1761–1833), a professor of Oriental languages at the University of Utrecht.

In 1826 he graduated from Utrecht with a dissertation titled Commentatio critica et exegetica in Paulinae Epistolae prioris ad Corinthos caput XIII. In 1831 he was appointed professor of theology at the University of Groningen, where he remained until his death in 1866. At Groningen he taught classes in exegesis and hermeneutics.

Pareau was one of the three founders of the so-called "Groningen School", a progressive movement within the Dutch Reformed Church. In 1837 he was co-founder, and for many years, editor of the journal Waarheid in Liefde (Truth in Love). With Petrus Hofstede de Groot (1802-1886), he was co-author of the Encyclopaedia theologi Christiani.
