= Lodewijk Caspar Valckenaer =

Dutch classical scholar (1715–1785)

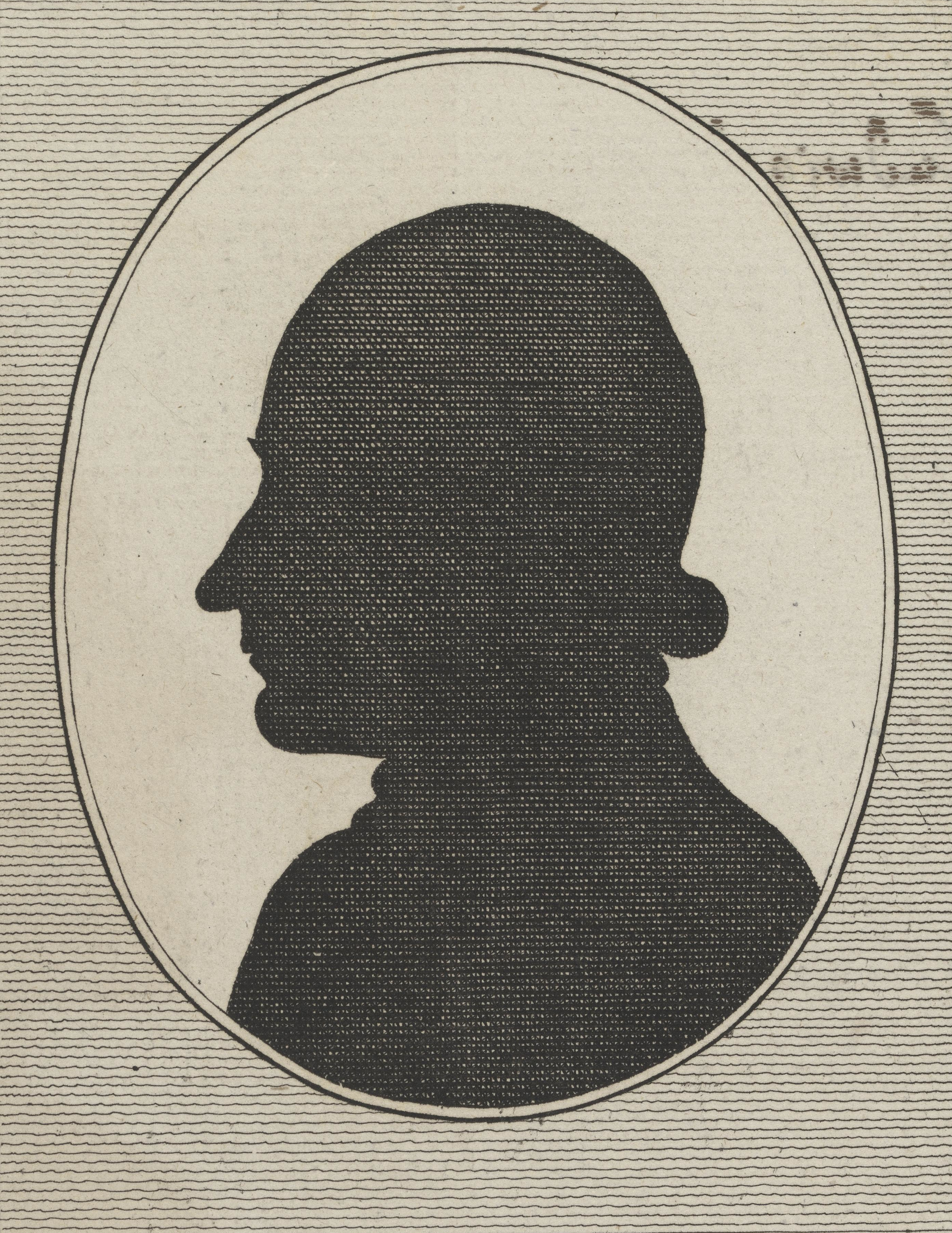
- 1775–1778 silhouette portrait of Valckenaer; his only known likeness
- Born: 7 June 1715; Leeuwarden, Frisia, Dutch Republic
- Died: 15 March 1785 (aged 69); Leiden, County of Holland, Dutch Republic

Academic work
- Institutions: Leiden University

Lodewijk Caspar Valckenaer (Latinized as Ludovicus Casparus Valckenaer; 7 June 1715, Leeuwarden – 15 March 1785, Leiden) was a Dutch classical scholar, at Leiden. He was a follower of Tiberius Hemsterhuis, and his successor in 1766 in the chair of Greek at Leiden. He was born in Leeuwarden.

The jurist and politician Johan Valckenaer (1759–1821) was his son.

== Works ==
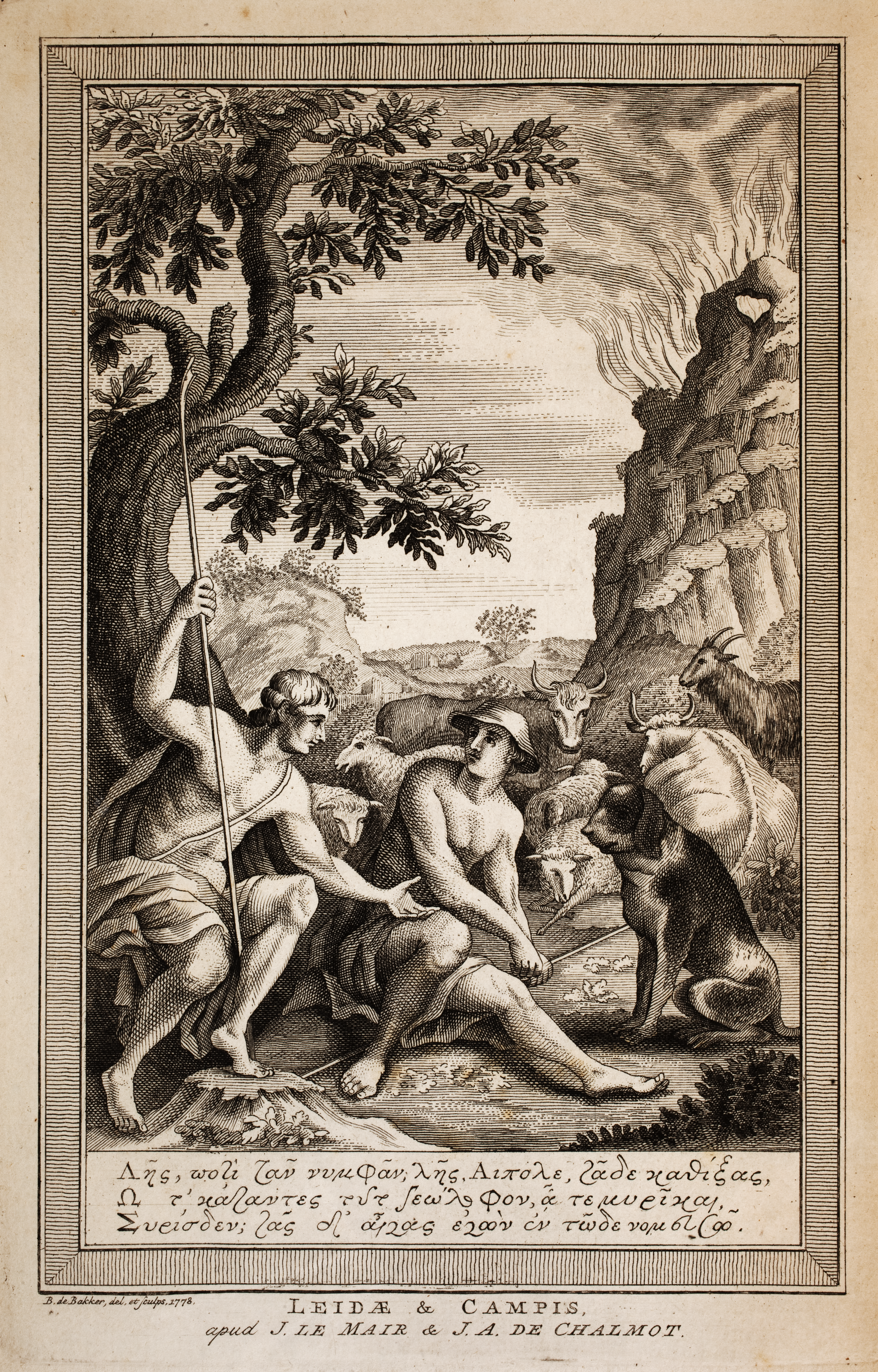
Title page of Theocritus: Carmina bucolica, edited by Valckenaer, Leiden 1779. Running Greek script.

- Ammonius. De adfinium vocabulorum differentia (Leiden 1739)
- Dictata in antiquitates Graecas (1751)
- Observationes philologicae in Evangelium Lucae (1751)
- Observationes philologicae in Actus Apostolicos (1752)
- Observationes philologicae in primam Pauli epistolam ad Corinthios (1752)
- Phoenissae (1755)
- Diatribe in Euripidis deperditorum dramatum reliquias (1767)
- Euripidis Tragoedia Hippolytus (Commentary, 1768)
- Diatribe de Aristobulo Judaeo: philosopho peripatetico Alexandrino (published posthumously, 1806)
