= Debundscha =

- Village
- Location within Cameroon
- Coordinates: 4°6′N 8°59′E
- Country: Cameroon
- Region: Southwest Region
- Division: Fako
- Elevation: 36 m (118 ft)
- Time zone: UTC+1 (WAT)
- Climate: Af

Debundscha is a village in the south-western Region of the republic of Cameroon. It is found at the foot of the Mount Cameroon at its south western corner directly facing the south Atlantic Ocean on the Cameroon coast.

Debundscha has an extremely wet climate with about 10,299 millimetres (405.5 in) of rainfall falling annually.

The village of Debundscha is included among the five rainiest places in the world which includes Lloró, Mawsynram, the Big Bog and Cherrapunji, with each of them receiving over 10,000 millimeters (400 inches) of rain annually.

== History ==
The Germans installed a lighthouse in Debundscha in 1904.

== Climate ==
Its proximity to the equator which is consistently hot and humid, gives Debundscha a long rainy season and a short dry season in a year. Debundscha's coastal location with the giant Mount Cameroon behind it, a giant mountain massive rising from the coast of the South Atlantic ocean to a height of about 4,095 metres (13,435 ft) and blocking rain forming clouds from passing it results in abundant rainfall for Debundscha during the year.

The major rainfall falls on the ocean-facing south-western slope of Mount Cameroon and on Debundscha, at the foot of this slope.

Climate data for Debundscha
Month	Jan	Feb	Mar	Apr	May	Jun	Jul	Aug	Sep	Oct	Nov	Dec	Year
Mean daily maximum °C (°F)	29.5 (85.1)	29.9 (85.8)	30.0 (86.0)	30.0 (86.0)	29.9 (85.8)	28.8 (83.8)	27.6 (81.7)	27.2 (81.0)	27.6 (81.7)	27.6 (81.7)	28.6 (83.5)	29.1 (84.4)	28.8 (83.9)
Daily mean °C (°F)	25.8 (78.4)	26.5 (79.7)	26.6 (79.9)	26.7 (80.1)	26.5 (79.7)	25.7 (78.3)	24.7 (76.5)	24.6 (76.3)	24.8 (76.6)	24.6 (76.3)	25.7 (78.3)	25.5 (77.9)	25.6 (78.2)
Mean daily minimum °C (°F)	22.1 (71.8)	23.1 (73.6)	23.1 (73.6)	23.3 (73.9)	23.1 (73.6)	22.6 (72.7)	21.8 (71.2)	22.0 (71.6)	22.1 (71.8)	21.6 (70.9)	22.8 (73.0)	22.0 (71.6)	22.5 (72.4)
Average rainfall mm (inches)	153 (6.0)	298 (11.7)	371 (14.6)	476 (18.7)	604 (23.8)	1,093 (43.0)	1,413 (55.6)	1,623 (63.9)	1,325 (52.2)	1,144 (45.0)	413 (16.3)	177 (7.0)	9,090 (357.8)
Mean monthly sunshine hours	147.3	143.7	122.3	118.4	119.4	89.1	61.5	35.4	52.8	67.9	99.4	130.8	1,188

== See also ==
- Communes of Cameroon
- Wettest places on Earth
