= La Vuelta, Chocó =

Village in Colombia

La Vuelta
- Vereda
- Location in Chocó and Colombia La Vuelta (Colombia)
- Coordinates: 5°27′31.9″N 76°32′42.0″W
- Country: Colombia
- Department: Chocó
- Municipality: Lloró Municipality
- Elevation: 330 ft (100 m)

Population (2005)
  - Total: 466
- Time zone: UTC-5 (Colombia Standard Time)

La Vuelta is a vereda in Lloró municipality, Chocó Department, Colombia.

== Climate ==
La Vuelta has an extremely wet tropical rainforest climate (Af).

Climate data for La Vuelta
Month	Jan	Feb	Mar	Apr	May	Jun	Jul	Aug	Sep	Oct	Nov	Dec	Year
Mean daily maximum °C (°F)	30.0 (86.0)	29.9 (85.8)	30.4 (86.7)	30.2 (86.4)	30.1 (86.2)	29.9 (85.8)	30.1 (86.2)	30.1 (86.2)	30.0 (86.0)	29.5 (85.1)	29.5 (85.1)	29.6 (85.3)	29.9 (85.9)
Daily mean °C (°F)	26.2 (79.2)	26.1 (79.0)	26.5 (79.7)	26.4 (79.5)	26.4 (79.5)	26.1 (79.0)	26.2 (79.2)	26.2 (79.2)	26.2 (79.2)	25.8 (78.4)	25.9 (78.6)	25.9 (78.6)	26.2 (79.1)
Mean daily minimum °C (°F)	22.4 (72.3)	22.3 (72.1)	22.7 (72.9)	22.7 (72.9)	22.7 (72.9)	22.4 (72.3)	22.4 (72.3)	22.4 (72.3)	22.5 (72.5)	22.2 (72.0)	22.3 (72.1)	22.3 (72.1)	22.4 (72.4)
Average rainfall mm (inches)	580.7 (22.86)	537.1 (21.15)	569.5 (22.42)	699.1 (27.52)	805.2 (31.70)	739.8 (29.13)	748.8 (29.48)	811.9 (31.96)	809.1 (31.85)	776.8 (30.58)	771.3 (30.37)	661.8 (26.06)	8,511.1 (335.08)
Average rainy days	21	19	20	23	24	23	24	24	24	24	23	21	270
