= Mile 50 =

Mile 50 (M50; also known as Mile Point 50 or MP50) is an operational, checkpoint, and rest areas located on the main mine route of Freeport Indonesia, Tembagapura District, Mimika Regency, Central Papua. This area is located on a strategic land route that connects the lowland area (Timika) with the highland area of the gold and copper mining center in Tembagapura.

== Function and geography ==
As part of the Freeport Indonesia mining road infrastructure, Mile 50 functions as a security post, logistics area, as well as a temporary resting place for convoys of vehicles transporting employees and company logistics. The route around Mile 50 is known for its steep, winding terrain and is surrounded by dense tropical rainforest vegetation of the New Guinea Highlands. Because of its location in a national vital object, security at this point is strictly guarded by joint forces of the Indonesian National Armed Forces (TNI) and the Indonesian National Police (Polri) in a special task force.

== Climate and rainfall ==
Mile 50 is claimed to be one of the wettest places in the world due to its extremely high global rainfall levels. Based on five-year meteorological data collected by the Meteorology, Climatology, and Geophysical Agency (BMKG) together with Freeport Indonesia since the October 2018 survey, this area receives rain on average 329 days a year.

In 2019, the observation station at Mile 50 recorded annual rainfall of 12,143 millimeters. This figure is about 279 millimeters higher than the average rainfall in Mawsynram in India, which currently holds the official world record from Guinness World Records. The high rainfall at Mile 50 is triggered by the orographic effect, where wet clouds from the coastal areas are pushed up and trapped by the steep walls of the New Guinea Highlands. As a form of recognition, BMKG together with the company's environmental division has installed a special signboard reading "The Wettest Place on Earth" in the Mile 50 observation station area and proposed it to the World Meteorological Organization (WMO).

== Security incidents ==
As part of the mining operational area in Mimika Regency, the Mile 50 area has been a hotspot for armed conflict several times.

One of the prominent incidents occurred on 11 February 2026, when a convoy of security forces vehicles and civilians was attacked by the Armed Criminal Group (KKB) or the West Papua National Liberation Army-Free Papua Organization (TPNPB-OPM) led by Jeki Murib. This incident resulted in the death of a TNI soldier, Sertu Arifin Cepa, and the death of a civilian named Erman Rustaman due to gunshot wounds. As a result of this incident, the management of Freeport Indonesia temporarily closed the Timika–Tembagapura main road access for operational safety. One of the planners of the attack was finally captured by the Operation Cartenz's Peace Task Force in March 2026.

== See also ==
- Freeport Indonesia
- Grasberg mine
- Tembagapura
