= Vortex filter =

Rainwater filter

Picture of an installed vortex filter

A vortex filter is a filter used in rainwater harvesting systems to separate medium to large sized debris from the flow of water before the water flows into a tank, cistern or reservoir. by directing the flow around the inside of the wall of the filter housing. Any material with a density greater than water is pushed to the outside and allows cleaner water to flow through a central fine mesh basket into the supply pipe.

All debris washes out of a large diameter drain pipe in the base of the filter body.

They are best suited for commercial and residential rainwater harvesting; however, they can be used for other process and wastewater filtering applications.

Before entering the tank for storage, rainwater should be both filtered and aerated. Filtration removes large particulate matter, which frequently both carries and feeds bacteria. Removal of this particulate matter, along with oxygenation of the water, greatly reduces the number of harmful bacteria in the tank.

WISY pre-tank filters accomplish both of these tasks, protecting the water quality in the tank. WISY Filters are also self-cleaning and require minimal annual maintenance.
