= Mawsynram =

Village in Meghalaya, India

- Town
- Location in Meghalaya, India Mawsynram (India)
- Coordinates: 25°17′56″N 91°34′53″E
- Country: India
- State: Meghalaya
- District: East Khasi Hills
- Talukas: Mawsynram C.D. Block

Area
  - Total: 2,788 km^{2} (1,076 sq mi)

Languages
  - Official: English, Khasi
- Time zone: UTC+5:30 (IST)
- PIN: 793113
- Telephone code: 03673
- Vehicle registration: ML
- Nearest city: Shillong
- Climate: Cwb

Mawsynram (/ˈmɔːsɪnˌrʌm/) is a town in the East Khasi Hills district of Meghalaya state in Northeastern India, 69 km (43 mi) from Shillong, the state capital. Mawsynram receives the highest rainfall in India. It is reportedly the wettest place on Earth, with an average annual rainfall of 11,872 millimetres (467.4 in). According to the Guinness Book of World Records, Mawsynram received 26,000 millimetres (1,023.6 in) of rainfall in 1985. Mawsynram received 745.3 millimetres (29.34 in) of rainfall on 19 August 2015. On 17 June 2022, Mawsynram set a new record by receiving 1,003.2 millimetres (39.50 in) in a span of 24 hours which has now become its highest single day record for the month of June and for its all-time single day record, beating its former record of 944.7 mm (37.19 in) on 7 June 1966.

== Location ==
Mawsynram

Climate chart (precipitation, max. and min. temperature)
J	F	M	A	M	J	J	A	S	O	N	D
17 16 7	30 17 9	163 21 12	451 22 15	1083 23 16	2348 22 18	2467 22 18	1714 23 18	853 23 18	338 22 15	52 19 11	11 17 8
- █ Average max. and min. temperatures in °C
- █ Precipitation totals in mm
Imperial conversion
J	F	M	A	M	J	J	A	S	O	N	D
0.7 60 44	1.2 62 48	6.4 69 54	18 72 58	43 73 61	92 72 64	97 72 64	67 73 64	34 73 64	13 72 60	2 67 52	0.4 62 46
- █ Average max. and min. temperatures in °F
- █ Precipitation totals in inches

Mawsynram is located at 25° 18′ N, 91° 35′ E, at an altitude of about 1,400 meters (4,600 ft), 15 km west of Cherrapunji, in the Khasi Hills in the state of Meghalaya (India).

=== Climate and rainfall ===
Under the Köppen climate classification, Mawsynram features a subtropical highland climate (Cwb) with an extraordinarily showery, rainy and long monsoonal season and a short dry season. Based on the data of a recent few decades, it appears to be the wettest place in the world, or the place with the highest average annual rainfall. Mawsynram receives over 10,000 millimetres or 390 inches of rain in an average year, and the vast majority of the rain it gets falls during the monsoon months. A comparison of rainfalls for Cherrapunji and Mawsynram for some years is given in Table 1. Mawsynram receives the highest rainfall in India. Although it is reportedly the wettest place on Earth, with an average annual rainfall of 11,872 millimetres (467.4 in), this claim is disputed by Lloró, Colombia, which reported an average yearly rainfall of 12,717 millimetres (500.7 in) between 1952 and 1989 and López de Micay, also in Colombia, which reported 12,892 millimetres (507.6 in) per year between 1960 and 2012. According to the records observed by the Indian Meteorological Department, it was seen that while its neighbour, Cherrapunji is having a significant decreasing trend in rainfall, Mawsynram on the other hand is experiencing a slight increase in its rainfall pattern which put its average annual rainfall from 1950 to 2000 at 12,393 millimetres (487.9 in) and from 2000 to 2020 at 12,120 millimetres (477.2 in). The precipitation table below shows the average monthly record from 1950 to 2000.

Climate data for Mawsynram
Month	Jan	Feb	Mar	Apr	May	Jun	Jul	Aug	Sep	Oct	Nov	Dec	Year
Mean daily maximum °C (°F)	15.5 (59.9)	16.8 (62.2)	20.7 (69.3)	22.1 (71.8)	22.5 (72.5)	22.3 (72.1)	22.4 (72.3)	22.9 (73.2)	22.8 (73.0)	22.0 (71.6)	19.2 (66.6)	16.6 (61.9)	20.5 (68.9)
Daily mean °C (°F)	11.2 (52.2)	12.8 (55.0)	16.5 (61.7)	18.4 (65.1)	19.2 (66.6)	19.9 (67.8)	20.2 (68.4)	20.4 (68.7)	20.3 (68.5)	18.6 (65.5)	15.2 (59.4)	12.3 (54.1)	17.1 (62.8)
Mean daily minimum °C (°F)	6.9 (44.4)	8.8 (47.8)	12.3 (54.1)	14.7 (58.5)	15.9 (60.6)	17.5 (63.5)	18.0 (64.4)	18.0 (64.4)	17.8 (64.0)	15.3 (59.5)	11.2 (52.2)	8.0 (46.4)	13.7 (56.7)
Average precipitation mm (inches)	19 (0.7)	25 (1.0)	198 (7.8)	490 (19.3)	1,436 (56.5)	3,162 (124.5)	3,300 (129.9)	2,330 (91.7)	1,050 (41.3)	331 (13.0)	48 (1.9)	4 (0.2)	12,393 (487.9)
Source: (year rain)

Primarily due to the high altitude, it seldom gets truly hot in Mawsynram. Average monthly temperatures range from around 11 °C (51.8 °F) in January to just above 20 °C (68 °F) in August. The village also experiences a brief but noticeably drier season from December until February, when monthly precipitation on average does not exceed 30 millimetres (1.2 in). The little precipitation during the village's "low sun" season is something that is shared by many areas with this type of climate.

The following table is a comparison of rainfalls for Cherrapunji and Mawsynram between 1970 and 2010.

Year	Cherrapunji Rainfall (mm)	Mawsynram Rainfall (mm)
2010	13 472	14 234
2009	9 070	12 459
2008	11 415	12 670
2007	12 647	13 302
2006	8 734	8 082
2005	9 758	10 072
2004	14 791	14 026
2003	10 499	11 767
2002	12 262	11 118
2001	9 071	10 765
2000	11 221	13 561
1999	12 503	13 445
1998	14 536	16 720
1997	8 993	9 892
1996	12 989	12 850
1995	14 189	13 832
1994	11 194	10 940
1993	12 807	13 848
1992	8 537	10 450
1991	13 494	16 112
1990	11 598	12 934
1989	13 432	8 828
1988	17 948	16 750
1987	13 153	NA
1986	8 140	NA
1985	11 816	26 000
1984	16 761	25 613
1983	9 773	12 163
1982	10 468	9 246
1981	9 113	9 739
1980	9 133	9 739
1979	12 095	NA
1978	6 950	NA
1977	11 689	11 986
1976	11 012	6 134
1975	11 976	10 639
1974	24 554	NA
1973	10 911	NA
1972	11 095	NA
1971	16 915	NA
1970	15 318	NA

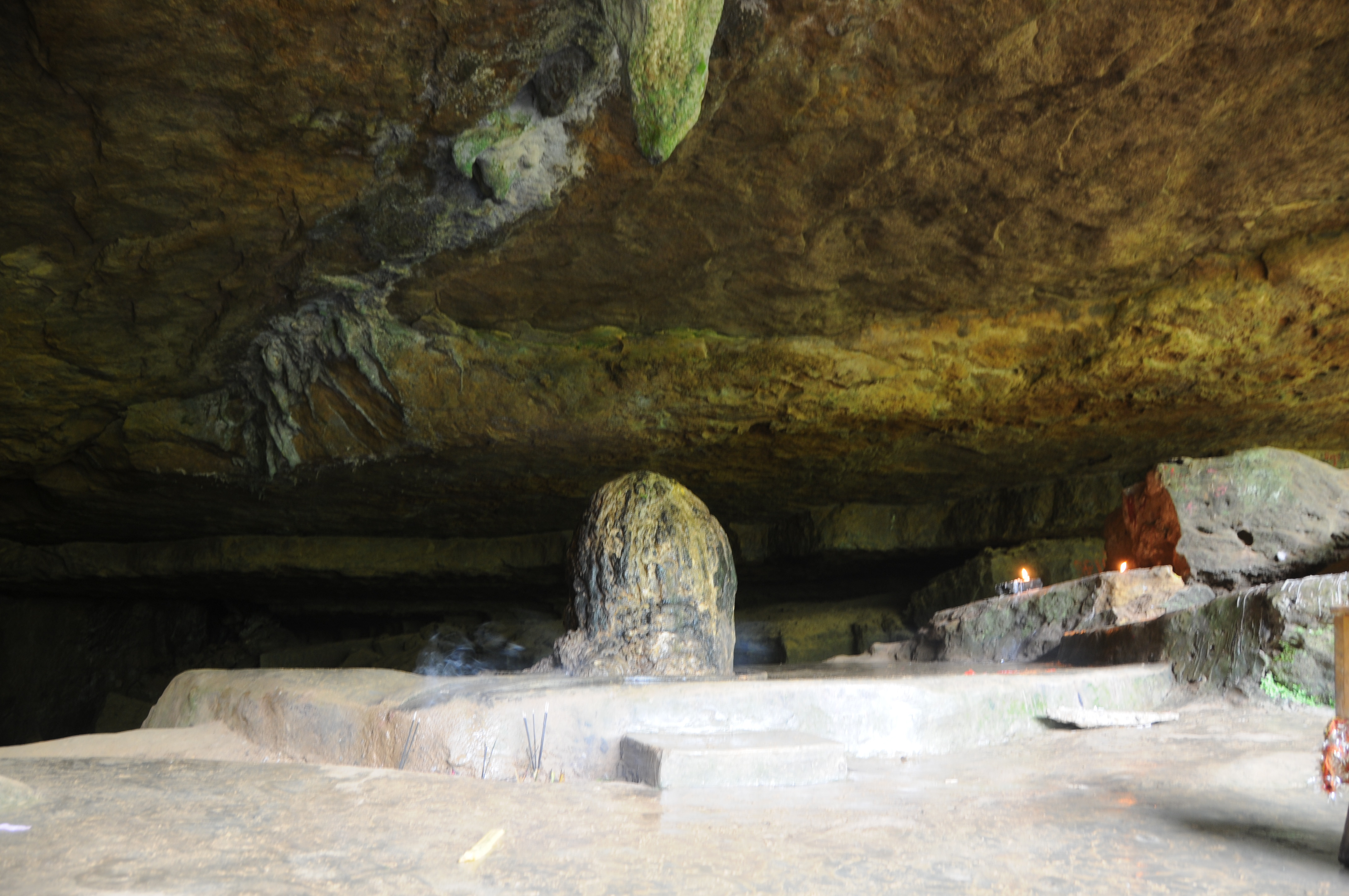
Natural stalagmite in Mawjymbuin Cave, Mawsynram Meghalaya.

Three reasons can be cited for high rainfall at Mawsynram:

1. The warm moist winds of the northward-moving air from the Bay of Bengal during the monsoon, which cover an extensive area but are forced to converge into the narrower zone over the Khasi Hills, thus concentrating their moisture.
2. The alignment of the Khasi Hills (east to west) places them directly in the path of the airflow from the Bay of Bengal, producing a significant uplift (plus cooling, further condensation and thus more rain).
3. Finally, uplift over the Khasi Hills is virtually continuous in the monsoon period because the lifted air is constantly being pulled up by vigorous winds in the upper atmosphere; hence, the rainfall is more or less continuous.

=== Natural landmarks ===
Located in Mawsynram, is a cave named Mawjymbuin, known for its stalagmites. Inside this cave is a pair of notable speleothems - stalactites shaped like large Shivling. The area is known for its many caves, both commercialized and non-commercialized.

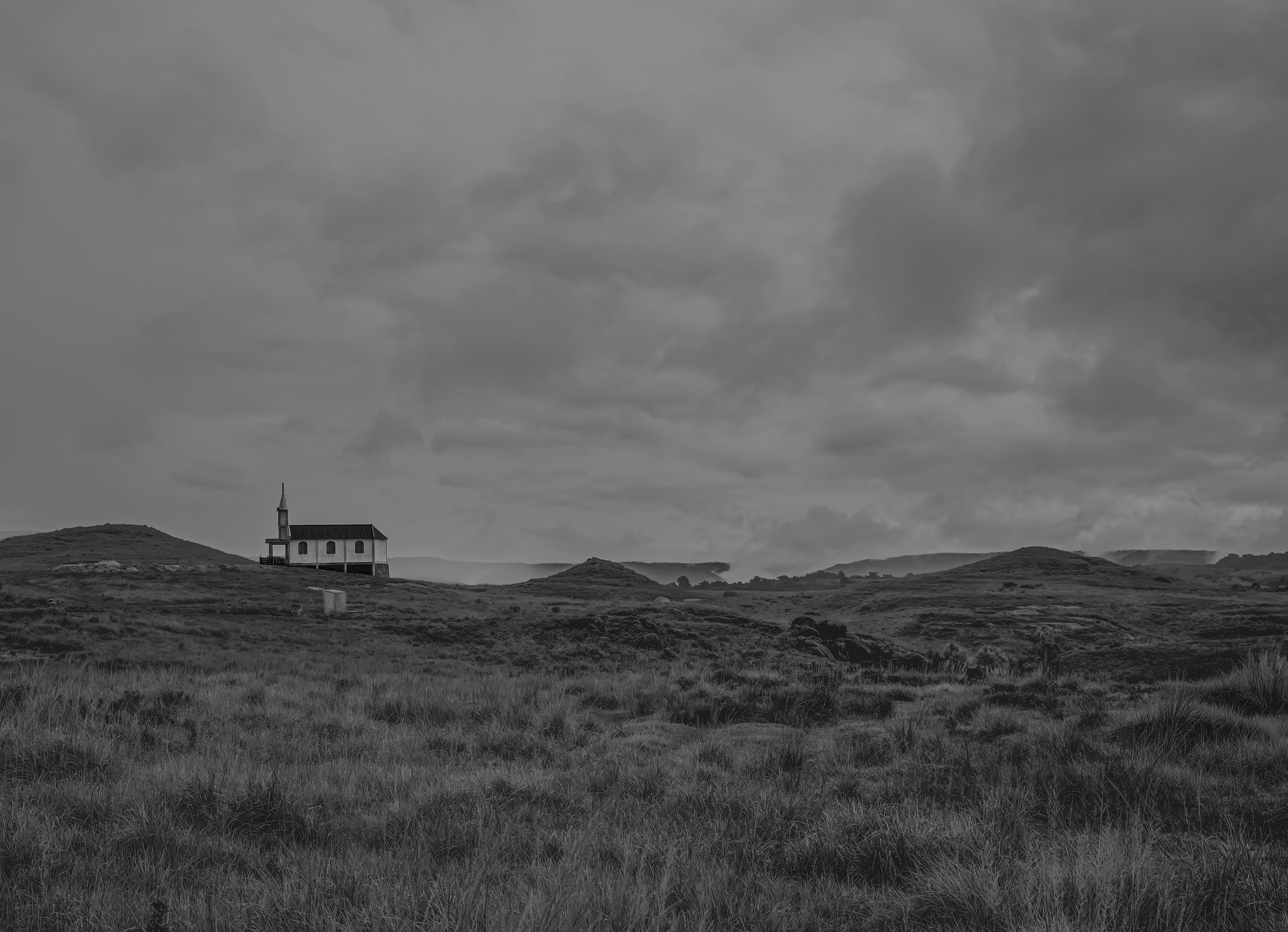
Mawsynram Landscape
