= Lloró =

Coordinates: 5°30′N 76°32′W

- Municipality and town
- Flag Coat of arms

- Location of the municipality and town of Lloró in the Chocó Department of Colombia.
- Country: Colombia
- Department: Chocó Department
- Founded: January 1, 1674

Government
  - Mayor: Heneil Correa Rentería

Area
  - Municipality and town: 905 km^{2} (349 sq mi)

Population (2015)
  - Municipality and town: 11,197
  - Density: 12.37/km^{2} (32.0/sq mi)
  - Urban: 3,406
- Time zone: UTC-5 (Colombia Standard Time)

Lloró is a municipality and town in the Chocó Department, Colombia. It claims the second world record for highest average annual precipitation with 12,717 mm (501 in), after López de Micay, which holds an also disputed record with 12,892.4 mm (508 in). The official record is held by Mawsynram, India. The rainfall data was measured in its Agricultural Farm, managed by the University of Bogotá, between 1952 and 1989. If accurate, that would make it the wettest place in the world. Although “lloró” is the 3rd person singular preterite tense of the Spanish verb “llorar” (to cry) which may colloquially be compared to rain, this similarity is merely incidental; the town is named for Gioró, a pre-Columbian indigenous chief.

An 1853 watercolor by Manuel María Paz portrays two men in straw hats with a female vendor at a liquor stand in Lloró.

== Climate ==
Lloró has a very wet tropical rainforest climate (Af). The town of Lloró itself has only 8000 mm of rain but the farm located to the east of the city has 12,892.4 mm.

Climate data for Lloró, elevation 90 m (300 ft), (1981–2010)
Month	Jan	Feb	Mar	Apr	May	Jun	Jul	Aug	Sep	Oct	Nov	Dec	Year
Mean daily maximum °C (°F)	30.2 (86.4)	30.5 (86.9)	30.8 (87.4)	30.8 (87.4)	31.2 (88.2)	31.1 (88.0)	31.3 (88.3)	31.3 (88.3)	30.9 (87.6)	30.6 (87.1)	30.4 (86.7)	30.2 (86.4)	30.8 (87.4)
Daily mean °C (°F)	26.1 (79.0)	26.3 (79.3)	26.4 (79.5)	26.5 (79.7)	26.6 (79.9)	26.5 (79.7)	26.5 (79.7)	26.5 (79.7)	26.4 (79.5)	26.2 (79.2)	26.1 (79.0)	26.0 (78.8)	26.3 (79.3)
Mean daily minimum °C (°F)	23.4 (74.1)	23.3 (73.9)	23.1 (73.6)	23.6 (74.5)	23.3 (73.9)	23.6 (74.5)	23.4 (74.1)	23.2 (73.8)	23.3 (73.9)	23.4 (74.1)	23.1 (73.6)	23.4 (74.1)	23.3 (73.9)
Average precipitation mm (inches)	579.7 (22.82)	508.8 (20.03)	541.4 (21.31)	715.1 (28.15)	759.2 (29.89)	702.5 (27.66)	746.0 (29.37)	752.1 (29.61)	753.2 (29.65)	621.4 (24.46)	728.3 (28.67)	593.4 (23.36)	7,806.5 (307.34)
Average precipitation days	21	19	19	22	23	23	23	24	23	23	23	22	250
Average relative humidity (%)	91	90	90	90	89	89	89	89	89	90	90	91	90
Source: Instituto de Hidrologia Meteorologia y Estudios Ambientales

== Populated centers and Veredas ==
- El Cajón
- Carmen de Surama
- Irabubú
- La Playita
- San Lorenzo
- Sesego
- El Tigre
- Urabará

== See also ==
- Wettest places on Earth
- Big Bog, Maui
- Cherrapunji
- Mount Waialeale
- Quibdó
