= List of Dutch discoveries =

The following list is composed of objects, concepts, phenomena and processes that were discovered or invented by people from the Netherlands.

== Discoveries ==
=== Archaeology ===
==== Java Man (Homo erectus erectus) (1891) ====
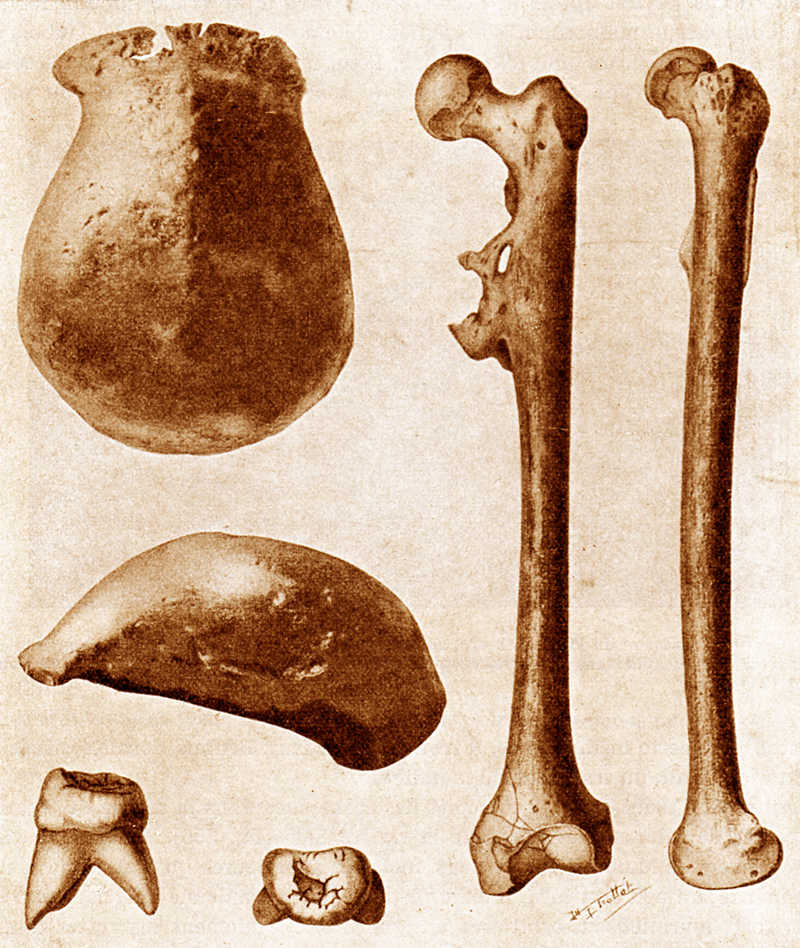
Original fossils of Pithecanthropus erectus (now Homo erectus) found in Java in 1891. Estimated to be between 700,000 and 1,000,000 years old, at the time of their discovery the fossils of "Java Man" were the oldest hominin fossils ever found.

Java Man (Homo erectus erectus) is the name given to hominid fossils discovered in 1891 at Trinil – Ngawi Regency on the banks of the Solo River in East Java, Indonesia, one of the first known specimens of Homo erectus. Its discoverer, Dutch paleontologist Eugène Dubois, gave it the scientific name Pithecanthropus erectus, a name derived from Greek and Latin roots meaning upright ape-man.

=== Astronomy ===
==== Columba (constellation) (1592) ====
Columba is a small, faint constellation named in the late sixteenth century. Its name is Latin for dove. It is located just south of Canis Major and Lepus. Columba was named by Dutch astronomer Petrus Plancius in 1592 in order to differentiate the 'unformed stars' of the large constellation Canis Major. Plancius first depicted Columba on the small celestial planispheres of his large wall map of 1592. It is also shown on his smaller world map of 1594 and on early Dutch celestial globes.

==== Novaya Zemlya effect (1597) ====
The first person to record the Novaya Zemlya effect was Gerrit de Veer, a member of Willem Barentsz' ill-fated third expedition into the polar region. Novaya Zemlya, the archipelago where de Veer first observed the phenomenon, lends its name to the effect.

==== 12 southern constellations (1597–1598) ====
Plancius defined 12 constellations created by Plancius from the observations of Pieter Dirkszoon Keyser and Frederick de Houtman.

- Apus is a faint constellation in the southern sky, first defined in the late 16th century. Its name means "no feet" in Greek, and it represents a bird-of-paradise (once believed to lack feet). It first appeared on a 35 cm diameter celestial globe published in 1597 (or 1598) in Amsterdam by Plancius with Jodocus Hondius.
- Chamaeleon is named after the chameleon, a kind of lizard.
- Dorado is now one of the 88 modern constellations. Dorado has been represented historically as a dolphinfish and a swordfish.
- Grus is Latin for the crane, a species of bird. The stars that form Grus were originally considered part of Piscis Austrinus (the southern fish).
- Hydrus' name means "male water snake".
- Indus represents an Indian, a word that could refer at the time to any native of Asia or the Americas.
- Musca is one of the minor southern constellations. It first appeared on a 35-cm diameter celestial globe published in 1597 (or 1598) in Amsterdam by Plancius and Hondius. The first depiction of this constellation in a celestial atlas was in Johann Bayer's Uranometria of 1603.
- Pavo is Latin for peacock.
- Phoenix is a minor southern constellation, named after the mythical phoenix. It was the largest of the twelve.
- Triangulum Australe is Latin for "the southern triangle", which distinguishes it from Triangulum in the northern sky and is derived from the almost equilateral pattern of its three brightest stars. It was first depicted on a celestial globe as Triangulus Antarcticus by Plancius in 1589, and later with more accuracy and its current name by Johann Bayer in his 1603 Uranometria.
- Tucana is Latin for the toucan, a South American bird.
- Volans represents a flying fish; its name is a shortened form of its original name, Piscis Volans.

==== Camelopardalis (constellation) (1612–1613) ====
Camelopardalis was created by Plancius in 1613 to represent the animal Rebecca rode to marry Isaac in the Bible. One year later, Jakob Bartsch featured it in his atlas. Johannes Hevelius gave it the official name of "Camelopardus" or "Camelopardalis" because he saw the constellation's many faint stars as the spots of a giraffe.

==== Monoceros (constellation) (1612–1613) ====
Monoceros is a relatively modern creation. Its first certain appearance was on a globe created by Plancius in 1612 or 1613. It was later charted by Bartsch as Unicornus in his 1624 star chart.

==== Rings of Saturn (1655) ====
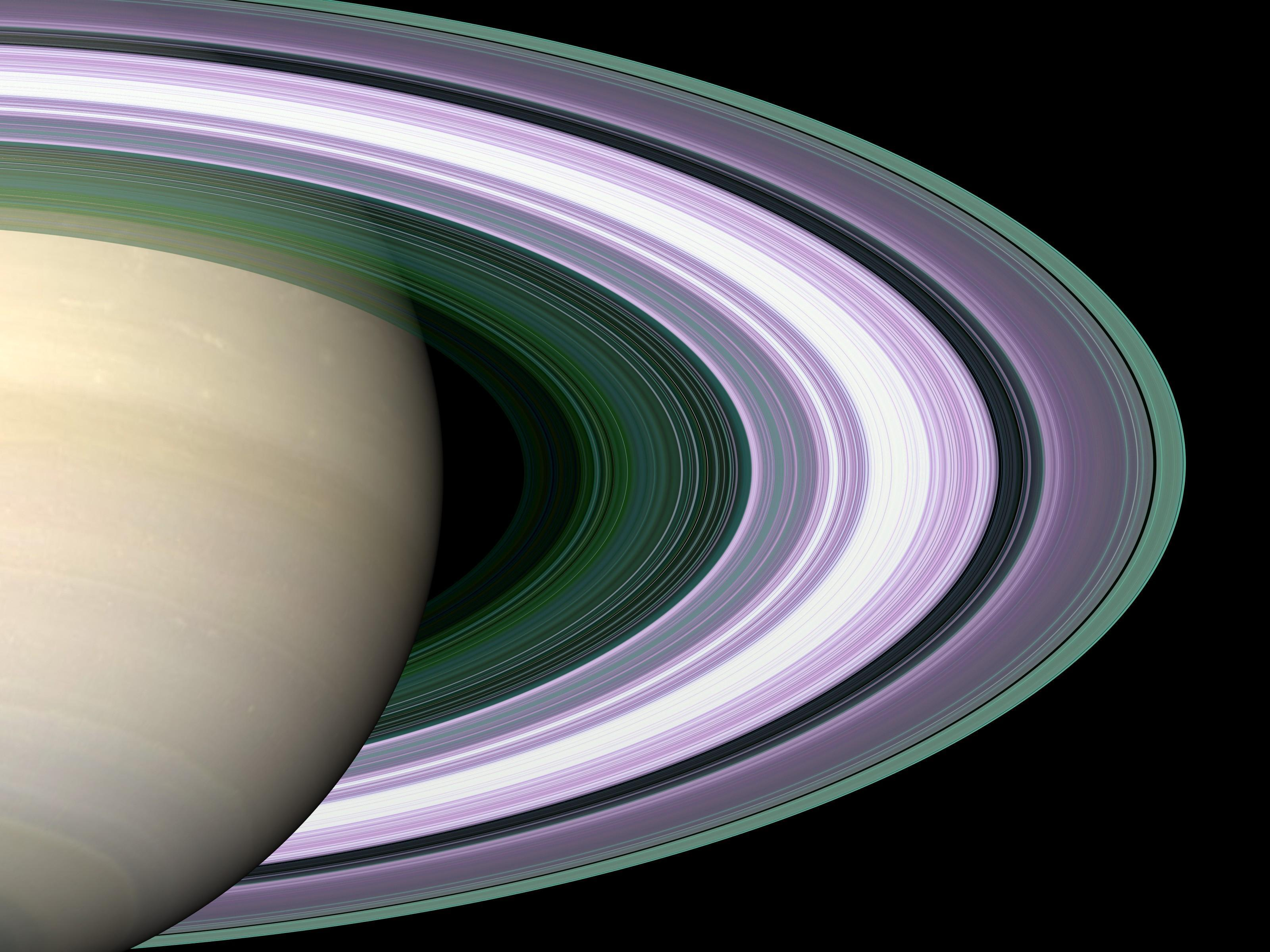
Christiaan Huygens was the first person to describe Saturn's rings as a disk surrounding Saturn

In 1655, Huygens became the first person to suggest that Saturn was surrounded by a ring, after Galileo's much less advanced telescope had failed to show rings. Galileo had reported the anomaly as possibly 3 planets instead of one.

==== Titan (Saturn's moon) (1655) ====
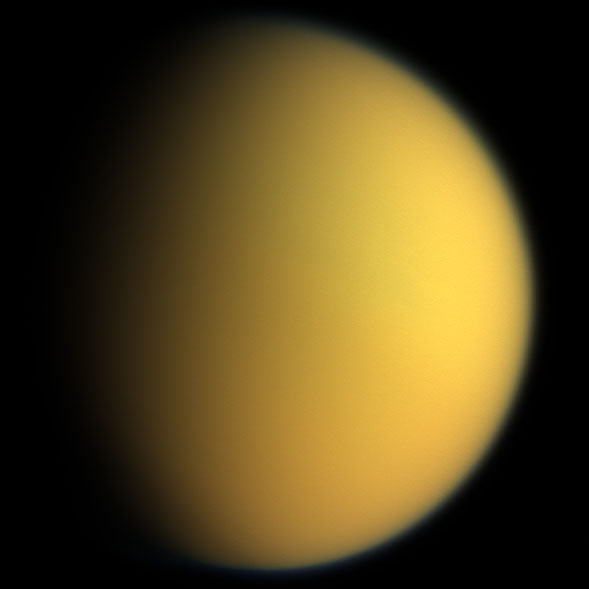
Titan was the first known moon of Saturn, discovered in 1655 by Christiaan Huygens.

In 1655, using a 50 power refracting telescope that he designed himself, Huygens discovered the first of Saturn's moons, Titan.

==== Kapteyn's Star (1897) ====
Kapteyn's Star is a class M1 red dwarf about 12.76 light-years from Earth in the southern constellation Pictor, and the closest halo star to the Solar System. With a magnitude of nearly 9 it is visible through binoculars or a telescope. It had the highest proper motion of any star known until the discovery of Barnard's Star in 1916. Attention was first drawn to what is now known as Kapteyn's Star by the Dutch astronomer Jacobus Kapteyn, in 1897.

==== Discovery of evidence for galactic rotation (1904) ====
In 1904, studying the proper motions of stars, Dutch astronomer Jacobus Kapteyn reported that these were not random, as it was believed in that time; stars could be divided into two streams, moving in nearly opposite directions. It was later realized that Kapteyn's data had been the first evidence of the rotation of our Galaxy, which ultimately led to the finding of galactic rotation by Bertil Lindblad and Jan Oort.

==== Galactic halo (1924) ====
In 1924, Dutch astronomer Jan Oort discovered the galactic halo, a group of stars orbiting the Milky Way but outside the main disk.

==== Oort constants (1927) ====
The Oort constants (discovered by Jan Oort) $A$ and $B$ are empirically derived parameters that characterize the local rotational properties of the Milky Way.

==== Evidence of dark matter (1932) ====
In 1932, Dutch astronomer Jan Oort became the first person to discover evidence of dark matter. Oort proposed the substance after measuring the motions of nearby stars in the Milky Way relative to the galactic plane. He found that the mass of the galactic plane must be more than the mass of the material that can be seen. A year later (1933), Fritz Zwicky examined the dynamics of clusters of galaxies and found their movements similarly perplexing.

==== Discovery of methane in the atmosphere of Titan (1944) ====
The first formal proof of the existence of an atmosphere around Titan came in 1944, when Gerard Kuiper observed Titan with the new McDonald 82-inch (2.1 m) telescope and discovered spectral signatures on Titan at wavelengths longer than 0.6 μm (micrometers), among which he identified two absorption bands of methane at 6190 and 7250 Å (Kuiper1944). This discovery was significant not only because it requires a dense atmosphere with a significant fraction of methane, but also because the atmosphere needs to be chemically evolved, since methane requires hydrogen in the presence of carbon, and molecular and atomic hydrogen would have escaped from Titan's weak gravitational field since the formation of the Solar System.

==== Discovery of carbon dioxide in the atmosphere of Mars (1947) ====
Using infrared spectrometry, in 1947 the Dutch-American astronomer Gerard Kuiper detected carbon dioxide in the Martian atmosphere, a discovery of biological significance because it is a principal gas in the process of photosynthesis (see also: History of Mars observation). He was able to estimate that the amount of carbon dioxide over a given area of the surface is double that on the Earth.

==== Miranda (Uranus's moon) (1948) ====
Miranda is the smallest and innermost of Uranus's five major moons. It was discovered by Gerard Kuiper on 16 February 1948 at McDonald Observatory.

==== Nereid (Neptune's moon) (1949) ====
Nereid, also known as Neptune II, is the third-largest moon of Neptune and was its second moon to be discovered, on 1 May 1949, by Gerard Kuiper, on photographic plates taken with the 82-inch telescope at McDonald Observatory.

==== Oort cloud (1950) ====
The Oort cloud or Öpik–Oort cloud, named after Dutch astronomer Jan Oort and Estonian astronomer Ernst Öpik, is a spherical cloud of predominantly icy planetesimals believed to surround the Sun at a distance of up to 50,000 AU (0.8 ly). Further evidence for the existence of the Kuiper belt emerged from the study of comets. That comets have finite lifespans has been known for some time. As they approach the Sun, its heat causes their volatile surfaces to sublimate into space, gradually evaporating them. In order for comets to continue to be visible over the age of the Solar System, they must be replenished frequently. One such area of replenishment is the Oort cloud, a spherical swarm of comets extending beyond 50,000 AU from the Sun first hypothesised by Dutch astronomer Jan Oort in 1950. The Oort cloud is believed to be the point of origin of long-period comets, which are those, like Hale–Bopp, with orbits lasting thousands of years.

==== Kuiper belt (1951) ====
The Kuiper belt was named after Dutch-American astronomer Gerard Kuiper, regarded by many as the father of modern planetary science, though his role in hypothesising it has been heavily contested. In 1951, he proposed the existence of what is now called the Kuiper Belt, a disk-shaped region of minor planets outside the orbit of Neptune, which also is a source of short-period comets.

=== Biology ===
==== Function of the fallopian tubes (1660s) ====
Dutch physician and anatomist Regnier de Graaf may have been the first to understand the reproductive function of the fallopian tubes. He described the hydrosalpinx, linking its development to female infertility. de Graaf recognized pathologic conditions of the tubes. He was aware of tubal pregnancies, and he surmised that the mammalian egg traveled from the ovary to the uterus through the tube.

==== Development of ovarian follicles (1672) ====
In his De Mulierum Organis Generatione Inservientibus (1672), de Graaf provided the first thorough description of the female gonad and established that it produced the ovum. De Graaf used the terminology vesicle or egg (ovum) for what now called the ovarian follicle. Because the fluid-filled ovarian vesicles had been observed previously by others, including Andreas Vesalius and Falloppio, De Graaf did not claim their discovery. He noted that he was not the first to describe them, but to describe their development. De Graaf was the first to observe changes in the ovary before and after mating and describe the corpus luteum. From the observation of pregnancy in rabbits, he concluded that the follicle contained the oocyte. The mature stage of the ovarian follicle is called the Graafian follicle in his honour, although others, including Fallopius, had noticed it previously but failed to recognize its reproductive significance.

==== Foundations of microbiology (discovery of microorganisms) (1670s) ====
Antonie van Leeuwenhoek is often considered to be the father of microbiology. Robert Hooke is cited as the first to record microscopic observation of the fruiting bodies of molds, in 1665. However, the first observation of microbes using a microscope is generally credited to van Leeuwenhoek. In the 1670s, he observed and researched bacteria and other microorganisms, using a single-lens microscope of his own design.

In 1981 the British microscopist Brian J. Ford found that Leeuwenhoek's original specimens had survived in the collections of the Royal Society of London. They were found to be of high quality, and were all well preserved. Ford carried out observations with a range of microscopes, adding to our knowledge of Leeuwenhoek's work.

==== Photosynthesis (1779) ====
Photosynthesis is a fundamental biochemical process in which plants, algae, and some bacteria convert sunlight to chemical energy. The process was discovered by Jan Ingenhousz in 1779. The chemical energy is used to drive reactions such as the formation of sugars or the fixation of nitrogen into amino acids, the building blocks for protein synthesis. Ultimately, nearly all living things depend on energy produced from photosynthesis. It is also responsible for producing the oxygen that makes animal life possible. Organisms that produce energy through photosynthesis are called photoautotrophs. Plants are the most visible representatives of photoautotrophs, but bacteria and algae also employ the process.

==== Plant respiration (1779) ====
Plant respiration was also discovered by Ingenhousz in 1779.

==== Foundations of virology (1898) ====
Martinus Beijerinck is considered one of the founders of virology. In 1898, he published results on his filtration experiments, demonstrating that tobacco mosaic disease is caused by an infectious agent smaller than a bacterium. His results were in accordance with similar observations made by Dmitri Ivanovsky in 1892. Like Ivanovsky and Adolf Mayer, predecessor at Wageningen, Beijerinck could not culture the filterable infectious agent. He concluded that the agent can replicate and multiply in living plants. He named the new pathogen virus to indicate its non-bacterial nature. This discovery is considered to be the beginning of virology.

==== Chemistry of photosynthesis (1931) ====
In 1931, Cornelis van Niel made key discoveries explaining the chemistry of photosynthesis. By studying purple sulfur bacteria and green sulfur bacteria, he was the first scientist to demonstrate that photosynthesis is a light-dependent redox reaction, in which hydrogen reduces carbon dioxide. Expressed as:

2 H_{2}A + CO_{2} → 2A + CH_{2}O + H_{2}O

where A is the electron acceptor. His discovery predicted that H_{2}O is the hydrogen donor in green plant photosynthesis and is oxidized to O_{2}. The chemical summation of photosynthesis was a milestone in the understanding of the chemistry of photosynthesis. This was later experimentally verified by Robert Hill.

==== Foundations of modern ethology (Tinbergen's four questions) (1930s) ====
Many naturalists have studied aspects of animal behaviour throughout history. Ethology has its scientific roots in the work of Charles Darwin and of American and German ornithologists of the late 19th and early 20th century, including Charles O. Whitman, Oskar Heinroth, and Wallace Craig. The modern discipline of ethology is generally considered to have begun during the 1930s with the work of Dutch biologist Nikolaas Tinbergen and by Austrian biologists Konrad Lorenz and Karl von Frisch.

Tinbergen's four questions, named after Nikolaas Tinbergen, one of the founders of modern ethology, are complementary categories of explanations for behaviour. It suggests that an integrative understanding of behaviour must include both a proximate and ultimate (functional) analysis of behaviour, as well as an understanding of both phylogenetic/developmental history and the operation of current mechanisms.

==== Vroman effect (1975) ====
The Vroman effect, named after Leo Vroman, is exhibited by protein adsorption to a surface by blood serum proteins.

=== Chemistry ===
==== Concept of gas (1600s) ====
Flemish physician Jan Baptist van Helmont is sometimes considered the founder of pneumatic chemistry, coining the word gas and conducting experiments involving gases. Van Helmont had derived the word "gas" from the Dutch word geest, which means ghost or spirit.

==== Foundations of stereochemistry (1874) ====
Dutch chemist Jacobus Henricus van 't Hoff is generally considered to be one of the founders of the field of stereochemistry. In 1874, Van 't Hoff built on the work on isomers of German chemist Johannes Wislicenus, and showed that the four valencies of the carbon atom were probably directed in space toward the four corners of a regular tetrahedron, a model which explained how optical activity could be associated with an asymmetric carbon atom. He shares credit for this with the French chemist Joseph Le Bel, who independently came up with the same idea. Three months before his doctoral degree was awarded Van 't Hoff published this theory, which today is regarded as the foundation of stereochemistry, first in a Dutch pamphlet in the fall of 1874, and then in the following May in a small French book entitled La chimie dans l'espace. A German translation appeared in 1877, at a time when the only job Van 't Hoff could find was at the Veterinary School in Utrecht. In these early years his theory was largely ignored by the scientific community, and was sharply criticized by one prominent chemist, Hermann Kolbe. However, by about 1880 support for Van 't Hoff's theory by such important chemists as Johannes Wislicenus and Viktor Meyer brought recognition.

==== Foundations of modern physical chemistry (1880s) ====
Jacobus van 't Hoff is also considered as one of the modern founders of the disciple of physical chemistry. The first scientific journal specifically in the field of physical chemistry was the German journal, Zeitschrift für Physikalische Chemie, founded in 1887 by Wilhelm Ostwald and Van 't Hoff. Together with Svante Arrhenius, these were the leading figures in physical chemistry in the late 19th century and early 20th century.

==== Van 't Hoff equation (1884) ====
The Van 't Hoff equation in chemical thermodynamics relates the change in the equilibrium constant, K_{eq}, of a chemical equilibrium to the change in temperature, T, given the standard enthalpy change, ΔH^{~~o~~}, for the process. It was proposed by Dutch chemist Jacobus Henricus van 't Hoff in 1884. The Van 't Hoff equation has been widely utilized to explore the changes in state functions in a thermodynamic system. The Van 't Hoff plot, which is derived from this equation, is especially effective in estimating the change in enthalpy, or total energy, and entropy, or amount of disorder, of a chemical reaction.

==== Van 't Hoff factor (1884) ====
The van 't Hoff factor $i$ is a measure of the effect of a solute upon colligative properties such as osmotic pressure, relative lowering in vapor pressure, elevation of boiling point and freezing point depression. The van 't Hoff factor is the ratio between the actual concentration of particles produced when the substance is dissolved, and the concentration of a substance as calculated from its mass.

==== Lobry de Bruyn–van Ekenstein transformation (1885) ====
In carbohydrate chemistry, the Lobry de Bruyn–van Ekenstein transformation is the base or acid-catalyzed transformation of an aldose into the ketose isomer or vice versa, with a tautomeric enediol as reaction intermediate. The transformation is relevant for the industrial production of certain ketoses and was discovered in 1885 by Cornelis Adriaan Lobry van Troostenburg de Bruyn and Willem Alberda van Ekenstein.

==== Prins reaction (1919) ====
The Prins reaction is an organic reaction consisting of an electrophilic addition of an aldehyde or ketone to an alkene or alkyne followed by capture of a nucleophile. Dutch chemist Hendrik Jacobus Prins discovered two new organic reactions, both now carrying the name Prins reaction. The first was the addition of polyhalogen compounds to olefins, was found during Prins doctoral research, while the others, the acid-catalyzed addition of aldehydes to olefinic compounds, became of industrial relevance.

==== Hafnium (1923) ====
Dutch physicist Dirk Coster and Hungarian-Swedish chemist George de Hevesy co-discovered Hafnium (Hf) in 1923, by means of X-ray spectroscopic analysis of zirconium ore. Hafnium' is named after Hafnia', the Latin name for Copenhagen (Denmark), where it was discovered.

==== Crystal bar process (1925) ====
The crystal bar process (also known as iodide process or the van Arkel–de Boer process) was developed by Dutch chemists Anton Eduard van Arkel and Jan Hendrik de Boer in 1925. It was the first industrial process for the commercial production of pure ductile metallic zirconium. It is used in the production of small quantities of ultra-pure titanium and zirconium.

==== Koopmans' theorem (1934) ====
Koopmans' theorem states that in closed-shell Hartree–Fock theory, the first ionization energy of a molecular system is equal to the negative of the orbital energy of the highest occupied molecular orbital (HOMO). This theorem is named after Tjalling Koopmans, who published this result in 1934. Koopmans became a Nobel laureate in 1975, though neither in physics nor chemistry, but in economics.

=== Genetics ===
==== Concept of pangene/gene (1889) ====
In 1889, Dutch botanist Hugo de Vries published his book Intracellular Pangenesis, in which he postulated that different characters have different hereditary carriers, based on a modified version of Charles Darwin's theory of Pangenesis of 1868. He specifically postulated that inheritance of specific traits in organisms comes in particles. He called these units pangenes.

==== Rediscovery the laws of inheritance (1900) ====
1900 marked the "rediscovery of Mendelian genetics". The significance of Gregor Mendel's work was not understood until early in the twentieth century, after his death, when his research was re-discovered by Hugo de Vries, Carl Correns and Erich von Tschermak, who were working on similar problems. They were unaware of Mendel's work. They worked independently on different plant hybrids, and came to Mendel's conclusions about the rules of inheritance.

=== Geology ===
==== Bushveld Igneous Complex (1897) ====
The Bushveld Igneous Complex (or BIC) is a large, layered igneous intrusion within the Earth's crust that has been tilted and eroded and now outcrops around what appears to be the edge of a great geological basin, the Transvaal Basin. Located in South Africa, the BIC contains some of Earth's richest ore deposits. The complex contains the world's largest reserves of platinum group metals (PGMs), platinum, palladium, osmium, iridium, rhodium, and ruthenium, along with vast quantities of iron, tin, chromium, titanium and vanadium. The site was discovered around 1897 by Dutch geologist Gustaaf Molengraaff.

=== Mathematics ===
==== Differential geometry of curves (concepts of the involute and evolute of a curve) (1673) ====
Christiaan Huygens was the first to publish in 1673 (Horologium Oscillatorium) a specific method of determining the evolute and involute of a curve

==== Korteweg–de Vries equation (1895) ====
In mathematics, the Korteweg–de Vries equation (KdV equation for short) is a mathematical model of waves on shallow water surfaces. It is particularly notable as the prototypical example of an exactly solvable model, that is, a non-linear partial differential equation whose solutions can be exactly and precisely specified. The equation is named for Diederik Korteweg and Gustav de Vries who, in 1895, proposed a mathematical model which allowed to predict the waves behaviour on shallow water surfaces.

==== Proof of the Brouwer fixed-point theorem (1911) ====
Brouwer fixed-point theorem is a fixed-point theorem in topology, named after Dutchman Luitzen Brouwer, who proved it in 1911.

==== Proof of the hairy ball theorem (1912) ====
The hairy ball theorem of algebraic topology states that there is no nonvanishing continuous tangent vector field on even-dimensional n-spheres. The theorem was first stated by Henri Poincaré in the late 19th century. It was first proved in 1912 by Brouwer.

==== Debye functions (1912) ====
The Debye functions are named in honor of Peter Debye, who came across this function (with n = 3) in 1912 when he analytically computed the heat capacity of what is now called the Debye model.

==== Kramers–Kronig relations (1927) ====
The Kramers–Kronig relations are bidirectional mathematical relations, connecting the real and imaginary parts of any complex function that is analytic in the upper half-plane. The relation is named in honor of Ralph Kronig and Hendrik Anthony Kramers.

==== Heyting algebra (formalized intuitionistic logic) (1930) ====
Formalized intuitionistic logic was originally developed by Arend Heyting to provide a formal basis for Luitzen Brouwer's programme of intuitionism. Arend Heyting introduced Heyting algebra (1930) to formalize intuitionistic logic.

==== Zernike polynomials (1934) ====
In mathematics, the Zernike polynomials are a sequence of polynomials that are orthogonal on the unit disk. Named after Frits Zernike, the Dutch optical physicist, and the inventor of phase contrast microscopy, they play an important role in beam optics.

==== Minnaert function (1941) ====
In 1941, Marcel Minnaert invented the Minnaert function, which is used in optical measurements of celestial bodies. The Minnaert function is a photometric function used to interpret astronomical observations and remote sensing data for the Earth.

=== Mechanics ===
==== Proof of the law of equilibrium on an inclined plane (1586) ====
In 1586, Simon Stevin (Stevinus) derived the mechanical advantage of the inclined plane by an argument that used a string of beads. Stevin's proof of the law of equilibrium on an inclined plane, known as the "Epitaph of Stevinus".

==== Centripetal force (1659) ====
A body experiencing uniform circular motion requires a centripetal force, towards the axis as shown, to maintain its circular path. In 1659, Christiaan Huygens coined the term "centrifugal force" and was the first to derive the now standard mathematical description for the centripetal force.

Christiaan Huygens stated what is now known as the second of Newton's laws of motion in a quadratic form. In 1659 he derived the now standard formula for the centripetal force, exerted by an object describing a circular motion, for instance on the string to which it is attached. In modern notation:

$$F_{c}=\frac{m\ v^2}{r}$$

with m the mass of the object, v the velocity and r the radius. The publication of the general formula for this force in 1673 was a significant step in studying orbits in astronomy. It enabled the transition from Kepler's third law of planetary motion, to the inverse square law of gravitation.

==== Centrifugal force (1659) ====
Huygens coined the term centrifugal force in his 1659 De Vi Centrifiga and wrote of it in his 1673 Horologium Oscillatorium on pendulums.

==== Formula for the period of mathematical pendulum (1659) ====
In 1659, Christiaan Huygens was the first to derive the formula for the period of an ideal mathematical pendulum (with massless rod or cord and length much longer than its swing), in modern notation:

$$T = 2 \pi \sqrt{\frac{l}{g}}$$

with T the period, l the length of the pendulum and g the gravitational acceleration. By his study of the oscillation period of compound pendulums Huygens made contributions to the development of the concept of moment of inertia.

==== Tautochrone curve (isochrone curve) (1659) ====
A tautochrone or isochrone curve is the curve for which the time taken by an object sliding without friction in uniform gravity to its lowest point is independent of its starting point. The curve is a cycloid, and the time is equal to π times the square root of the radius over the acceleration of gravity. Christiaan Huygens was the first to discover the tautochronous property (or isochronous property) of the cycloid. The tautochrone problem, the attempt to identify this curve, was solved by Christiaan Huygens in 1659. He proved geometrically in his Horologium Oscillatorium, originally published in 1673, that the curve was a cycloid. Huygens also proved that the time of descent is equal to the time a body takes to fall vertically the same distance as the diameter of the circle which generates the cycloid, multiplied by π/2. The tautochrone curve is the same as the brachistochrone curve for any given starting point. Johann Bernoulli posed the problem of the brachistochrone to the readers of Acta Eruditorum in June, 1696. He published his solution in the journal in May of the following year, and noted that the solution is the same curve as Huygens's tautochrone curve.

==== Coupled oscillation (spontaneous synchronization) (1665) ====
Christiaan Huygens observed that two pendulum clocks mounted next to each other on the same support often become synchronized, swinging in opposite directions. In 1665, he reported the results by letter to the Royal Society of London. It is referred to as "an odd kind of sympathy" in the Society's minutes. This may be the first published observation of what is now called coupled oscillations. In the 20th century, coupled oscillators took on great practical importance because of two discoveries: lasers, in which different atoms give off light waves that oscillate in unison, and superconductors, in which pairs of electrons oscillate in synchrony, allowing electricity to flow with almost no resistance. Coupled oscillators are even more ubiquitous in nature, showing up, for example, in the synchronized flashing of fireflies and chirping of crickets, and in the pacemaker cells that regulate heartbeats.

=== Medicine ===
==== Foundations of modern (human) anatomy (1543) ====
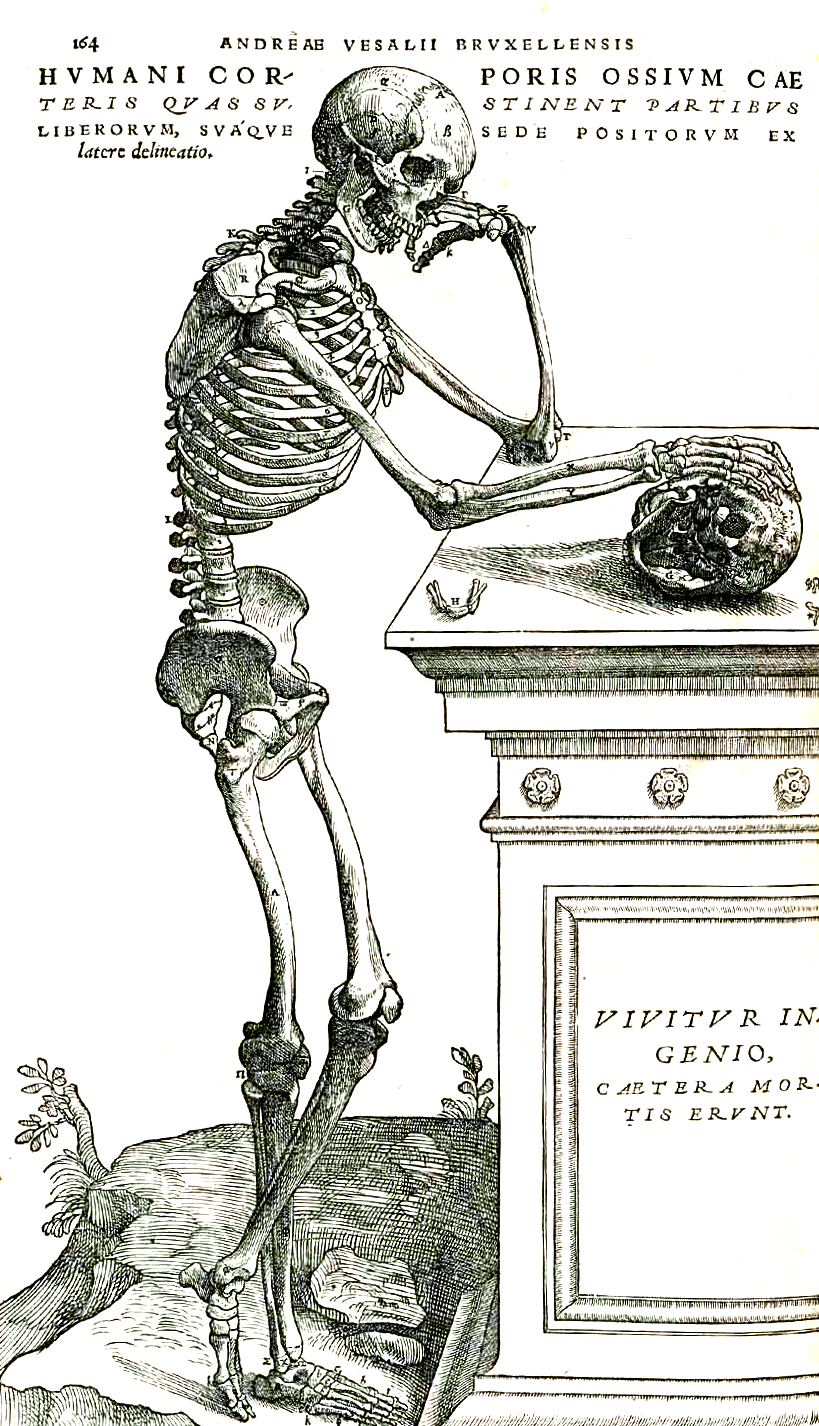
One of the large, detailed illustrations in Andreas Vesalius's De humani corporis fabrica, 1543

Flemish anatomist and physician Andreas Vesalius is often referred to as the founder of modern human anatomy for the publication of the seven-volume De humani corporis fabrica (On the Structure of the Human Body) in 1543.

==== Crystals in gouty tophi (1679) ====
In 1679, van Leeuwenhoek used a microscopes to assess tophaceous material and found that gouty tophi consist of aggregates of needle-shaped crystals, and not globules of chalk as was previously believed.

==== Boerhaave syndrome (1724) ====
Boerhaave syndrome (also known as spontaneous esophageal perforation or esophageal rupture) refers to an esophageal rupture secondary to forceful vomiting. Originally described in 1724 by Dutch physician/botanist Herman Boerhaave, it is a rare condition with high mortality. The syndrome was described after the case of a Dutch admiral, Baron Jan von Wassenaer, who died of the condition.

==== Factor V Leiden (1994) ====
Factor V Leiden is an inherited disorder of blood clotting. It is a variant of human factor V that causes a hypercoagulability disorder. It is named after the city Leiden, where it was first identified by R. Bertina, et al., in 1994.

=== Microbiology ===
==== Blood cells (1658) ====
In 1658 Dutch naturalist Jan Swammerdam was the first person to observe red blood cells under a microscope and in 1695, microscopist Antoni van Leeuwenhoek, also Dutch, was the first to draw an illustration of "red corpuscles", as they were called. No further blood cells were discovered until 1842 when the platelets were discovered.

==== Red blood cells (1658) ====
The first person to observe and describe red blood cells was Dutch biologist Jan Swammerdam, who had used an early microscope to study the blood of a frog.

==== Micro-organisms (1670s) ====
A resident of Delft, Anton van Leeuwenhoek, used a high-power single-lens simple microscope to discover the world of micro-organisms. His simple microscopes were made of silver or copper frames, holding hand-ground lenses were capable of magnification up to 275 times. Using these he was the first to observe and describe single-celled organisms, which he originally referred to as animalcules, and which now referred to as micro-organisms or microbes.

- Infusoria (1674) – Infusoria is a collective term for minute aquatic creatures including ciliate, euglena, paramecium, protozoa and unicellular algae that exist in freshwater ponds. However, in formal classification microorganism called infusoria belongs to Kingdom Animalia, Phylum Protozoa, Class Ciliates (Infusoria). They were first discovered by Antoni van Leeuwenhoek.

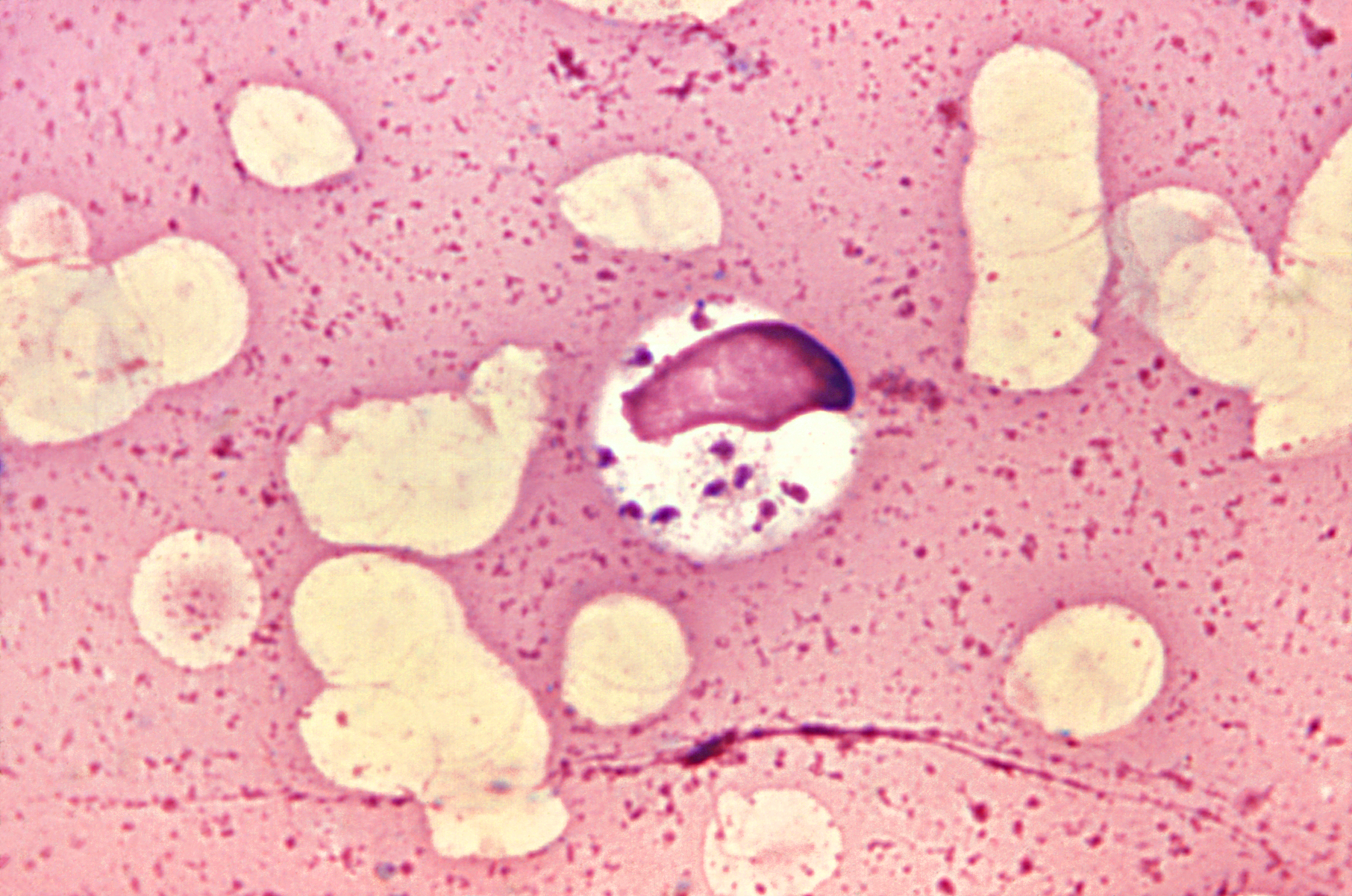
Leishmania donovani, (a species of protozoa) in a bone marrow cell

- Protozoa (1674) – In 1674, Van Leeuwenhoek was the first person to observe and describe protozoa.
- Bacteria (1676) – The first bacteria were observed by van Leeuwenhoek in 1676 using his single-lens microscope. He described the creatures he saw as small creatures. The name bacterium was introduced much later, by Christian Gottfried Ehrenberg in 1828, derived from the Greek word βακτηριον meaning "small stick". Because of the difficulty in describing individual bacteria and the importance of their discovery, the study of bacteria is generally that of the study of microbiology.
- Sperm cells (1677) – Sperm cells were first observed by Anton van Leeuwenhoek in 1677. The term "sperm" refers to the male reproductive cells. A uniflagellar sperm cell that is motile is referred to as a "spermatozoon", whereas a non-motile sperm cell is referred to as a "spermatium".
- Spermatozoa (1677) – A spermatozoon or spermatozoon (pl. spermatozoa), from the ancient Greek σπερμα (seed) and ζων (alive) and more commonly known as a sperm cell, is the haploid cell that is the male gamete. Sperm cells were first observed by a student of van Leeuwenhoek in 1677. Leeuwenhoek pictured sperm cells with great accuracy.

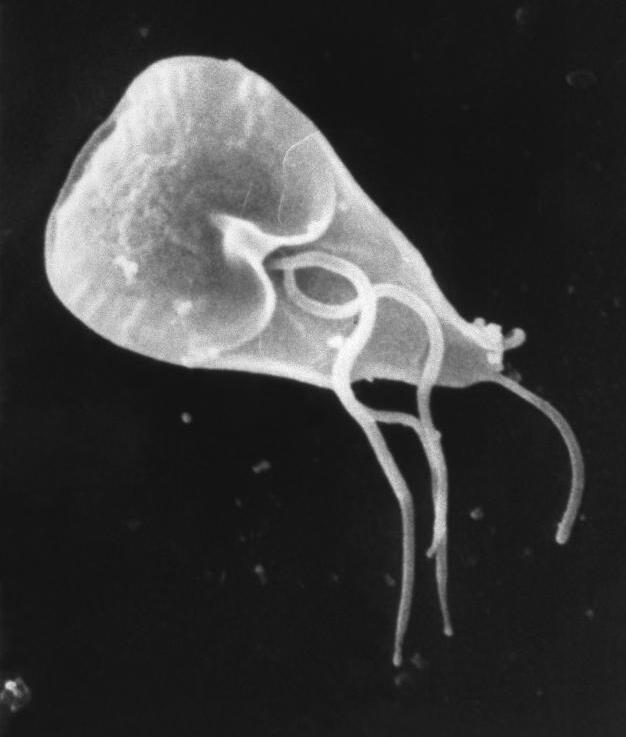
Giardia trophozoite, SEM. The trophozoite form of Giardia was first observed in 1681 by Antonie van Leeuwenhoek in his own diarrhea stools.

- Giardia (1681) – Giardia is a genus of anaerobic flagellated protozoan parasites of the phylum Sarcomastigophora that colonise and reproduce in the small intestines of several vertebrates, causing giardiasis. Their life cycle alternates between an actively swimming trophozoite and an infective, resistant cyst. The trophozoite form of Giardia was first observed in 1681 by Van Leeuwenhoek during observation of his own stool.

Volvox (1700)- Volvox is a genus of chlorophytes, a type of green algae. It forms spherical colonies of up to 50,000 cells. They live in a variety of freshwater habitats, and were first reported by Van Leeuwenhoek in 1700.

==== Biological nitrogen fixation (1885) ====
Biological nitrogen fixation was discovered by Martinus Beijerinck in 1885.

==== Rhizobium (1888) ====
Rhizobium is a genus of Gram-negative soil bacteria that fix nitrogen. Rhizobium forms an endosymbiotic nitrogen fixing association with roots of legumes and Parasponia. Martinus Beijerinck in the Netherlands was the first to isolate and cultivate a microorganism from the nodules of legumes in 1888. He named it Bacillus radicicola, which is now placed in Bergey's Manual of Determinative Bacteriology under the genus Rhizobium.

==== Spirillum (first isolated sulfate-reducing bacteria) (1895) ====
Martinus Beijerinck discovered the phenomenon of bacterial sulfate reduction, a form of anaerobic respiration. He learned that bacteria could use sulfate as a terminal electron acceptor, instead of oxygen. He isolated and described Spirillum desulfuricans (now called Desulfovibrio desulfuricans), the first known sulfate-reducing bacterium.

==== Concept of virus (1898) ====
In 1898 Beijerinck coined the term "virus" to indicate that the causal agent of tobacco mosaic disease was non-bacterial. Beijerinck discovered what is now known as the tobacco mosaic virus. He observed that the agent multiplied only in cells that were dividing and he called it a contagium vivum fluidum (contagious living fluid). Beijerinck's discovery is considered to be the beginning of virology.

==== Azotobacter (1901) ====
Azotobacter is a genus of usually motile, oval or spherical bacteria that form thick-walled cysts and may produce large quantities of capsular slime. They are aerobic, free-living soil microbes which play an important role in the nitrogen cycle in nature, binding atmospheric nitrogen, which is inaccessible to plants, and releasing it in the form of ammonium ions into the soil. Apart from being a model organism, it is used by humans for the production of biofertilizers, food additives, and some biopolymers. The first representative of the genus, Azotobacter chroococcum, was discovered and described in 1901 by the Dutch microbiologist and botanist Martinus Beijerinck.

==== Enrichment culture (1904) ====
Beijerinck is credited with developing the first enrichment culture, a fundamental method of studying microbes from the environment.

=== Physics ===
==== 31 equal temperament (1661) ====
Division of the octave into 31 steps arose naturally out of Renaissance music theory; the lesser diesis – the ratio of an octave to three major thirds, 128:125 or 41.06 cents – was approximately a fifth of a tone and a third of a semitone. In 1666, Lemme Rossi first proposed an equal temperament of this order. Shortly thereafter, having discovered it independently, scientist Christiaan Huygens wrote about it also. Since the standard system of tuning at that time was quarter-comma meantone, in which the fifth is tuned to 5^{1/4}, the appeal of this method was immediate, as the fifth of 31-et, at 696.77 cents, is only 0.19 cent wider than the fifth of quarter-comma meantone. Huygens not only realized this, he went farther and noted that 31-ET provides an excellent approximation of septimal, or 7-limit harmony. In the twentieth century, physicist, music theorist and composer Adriaan Fokker, after reading Huygens's work, led a revival of interest in this system of tuning which led to a number of compositions, particularly by Dutch composers. Fokker designed the Fokker organ, a 31-tone equal-tempered organ, which was installed in Teyler's Museum in Haarlem in 1951.

==== Polarization of light (1678) ====
In 1678, Huygens discovered the polarization of light by double refraction in calcite.

==== Huygens' principle (concepts of the wavefront and wavelet) (1690) ====
In his Treatise on light, Huygens showed how Snell's law of sines could be explained by, or derived from, the wave nature of light, using the Huygens–Fresnel principle.

==== Bernoulli's principle (1738) ====
Bernoulli's principle was discovered by Dutch-Swiss mathematician and physicist Daniel Bernoulli and named after him. It states that for an inviscid flow, an increase in the speed of the fluid occurs simultaneously with a decrease in pressure or a decrease in the fluid's potential energy.

==== Brownian motion (1785) ====
In 1785, Ingenhousz described the irregular movement of coal dust on the surface of alcohol and therefore has a claim as discoverer of what came to be known as Brownian motion.

==== Buys Ballot's law (1857) ====
The law takes its name from Dutch meteorologist C. H. D. Buys Ballot, who published it in the Comptes Rendus, in November 1857. While William Ferrel first theorized this in 1856, Buys Ballot was the first to provide an empirical validation. The law states that in the Northern Hemisphere, if a person stands with his back to the wind, the low pressure area will be on his left, because wind travels counterclockwise around low pressure zones in that hemisphere. this is approximately true in the higher latitudes and is reversed in the Southern Hemisphere.

==== Foundations of molecular physics (1873) ====
Spearheaded by Mach and Ostwald, a strong philosophical current that denied the existence of molecules arose towards the end of the 19th century. The molecular existence was considered unproven and the molecular hypothesis unnecessary. At the time Van der Waals' thesis was written (1873), the molecular structure of fluids had not been accepted by most physicists, and liquid and vapor were often considered as chemically distinct. But Van der Waals's work affirmed the reality of molecules and allowed an assessment of their size and attractive strength. By comparing his equation of state with experimental data, Van der Waals was able to obtain estimates for the actual size of molecules and the strength of their mutual attraction. By introducing parameters characterizing molecular size and attraction in constructing his equation of state, Van der Waals set the tone for molecular physics (molecular dynamics in particular) of the 20th century. That molecular aspects such as size, shape, attraction, and multipolar interactions should form the basis for mathematical formulations of the thermodynamic and transport properties of fluids is presently considered an axiom.

==== Van der Waals equation of state (1873) ====
In 1873, J. D. van der Waals introduced the first equation of state derived by the assumption of a finite volume occupied by the constituent molecules. The Van der Waals equation is generally regarded as the first somewhat realistic equation of state (beyond the ideal gas law). Van der Waals noted the non-ideality of gases and attributed it to the existence of molecular or atomic interactions. His new formula revolutionized the study of equations of state, and was most famously continued via the Redlich-Kwong equation of state (1949) and the Soave modification of Redlich-Kwong. While the Van der Waals equation is definitely superior to the ideal gas law and does predict the formation of a liquid phase, the agreement with experimental data is limited for conditions where the liquid forms. Except at higher pressures, the real gases do not obey Van der Waals equation in all ranges of pressures and temperatures. Despite its limitations, the equation has historical importance, because it was the first attempt to model the behaviour of real gases.

==== Van der Waals forces (1873) ====
The van der Waals forces are named after the scientist who first described them in 1873. Johannes Diderik van der Waals noted the non-ideality of gases and attributed it to the existence of molecular or atomic interactions. They are forces that develop between the atoms inside molecules and keep them together. The Van der Waals forces between molecules, much weaker than chemical bonds but present universally, play a role in fields as diverse as supramolecular chemistry, structural biology, polymer science, nanotechnology, surface science, and condensed matter physics.

==== Van der Waals radius (1873) ====
The Van der Waals radius, r_{w}, of an atom is the radius of an imaginary hard sphere which can be used to model the atom for many purposes. It is named after Johannes Diderik van der Waals, winner of the 1910 Nobel Prize in Physics, as he was the first to recognise that atoms were not simply points and to demonstrate the physical consequences of their size through the van der Waals equation of state.

==== Law of corresponding states (1880) ====
The law of corresponding states was first suggested and formulated by van der Waals in 1880. This showed that the van der Waals equation of state can be expressed as a simple function of the critical pressure, critical volume and critical temperature. This general form is applicable to all substances. The compound-specific constants a and b in the original equation are replaced by universal (compound-independent) quantities. It was this law that served as a guide during experiments which ultimately led to the liquefaction of hydrogen by James Dewar in 1898 and of helium by Heike Kamerlingh Onnes in 1908.

==== Lorentz ether theory (1892) ====
Lorentz ether theory has its roots in Hendrik Lorentz's "theory of electrons", which was the final point in the development of the classical aether theories at the end of the 19th and at the beginning of the 20th century. Lorentz's initial theory created in 1892 and 1895 was based on a completely motionless aether. Many aspects of Lorentz's theory were incorporated into special relativity with the works of Albert Einstein and Hermann Minkowski.

==== Lorentz force law (1892) ====
Lorentz force F on a charged particle (of charge q) in motion (instantaneous velocity v). The E field and B field vary in space and time.

In 1892, Hendrik Lorentz derived the modern form of the formula for the electromagnetic force which includes the contributions to the total force from both the electric and the magnetic fields. In many textbook treatments of classical electromagnetism, the Lorentz force law is used as the definition of the electric and magnetic fields E and B. To be specific, the Lorentz force is understood to be the following empirical statement:

The electromagnetic force F on a test charge at a given point and time is a certain function of its charge q and velocity v, which can be parameterized by exactly two vectors E and B, in the functional form:

$$\mathbf{F}=q(\mathbf{E}+\mathbf{v}\times\mathbf{B})$$

==== Abraham–Lorentz force (1895) ====
In the physics of electromagnetism, the Abraham–Lorentz force (also Lorentz-Abraham force) is the recoil force on an accelerating charged particle caused by the particle emitting electromagnetic radiation. It is also called the radiation reaction force or the self force.

==== Lorentz transformation (1895) ====
In physics, the Lorentz transformation (or Lorentz transformations) is named after the Dutch physicist Hendrik Lorentz. It was the result of attempts by Lorentz and others to explain how the speed of light was observed to be independent of the reference frame, and to understand the symmetries of the laws of electromagnetism. The Lorentz transformation is in accordance with special relativity, but was derived before special relativity. Early approximations of the transformation were published by Lorentz in 1895. In 1905, Poincaré was the first to recognize that the transformation has the properties of a mathematical group, and named it after Lorentz.

==== Lorentz contraction (1895) ====
In physics, length contraction (more formally called Lorentz contraction or Lorentz–FitzGerald contraction after Hendrik Lorentz and George FitzGerald) is the phenomenon of a decrease in length measured by the observer, of an object which is traveling at any non-zero velocity relative to the observer. This contraction is usually only noticeable at a substantial fraction of the speed of light.

==== Lorentz factor (1895) ====
The Lorentz factor or Lorentz term is the factor by which time, length, and relativistic mass change for an object while that object is moving. It is an expression which appears in several equations in special relativity, and it arises from deriving the Lorentz transformations. The name originates from its earlier appearance in Lorentzian electrodynamics – named after the Dutch physicist Hendrik Lorentz.

==== Zeeman effect (1896) ====
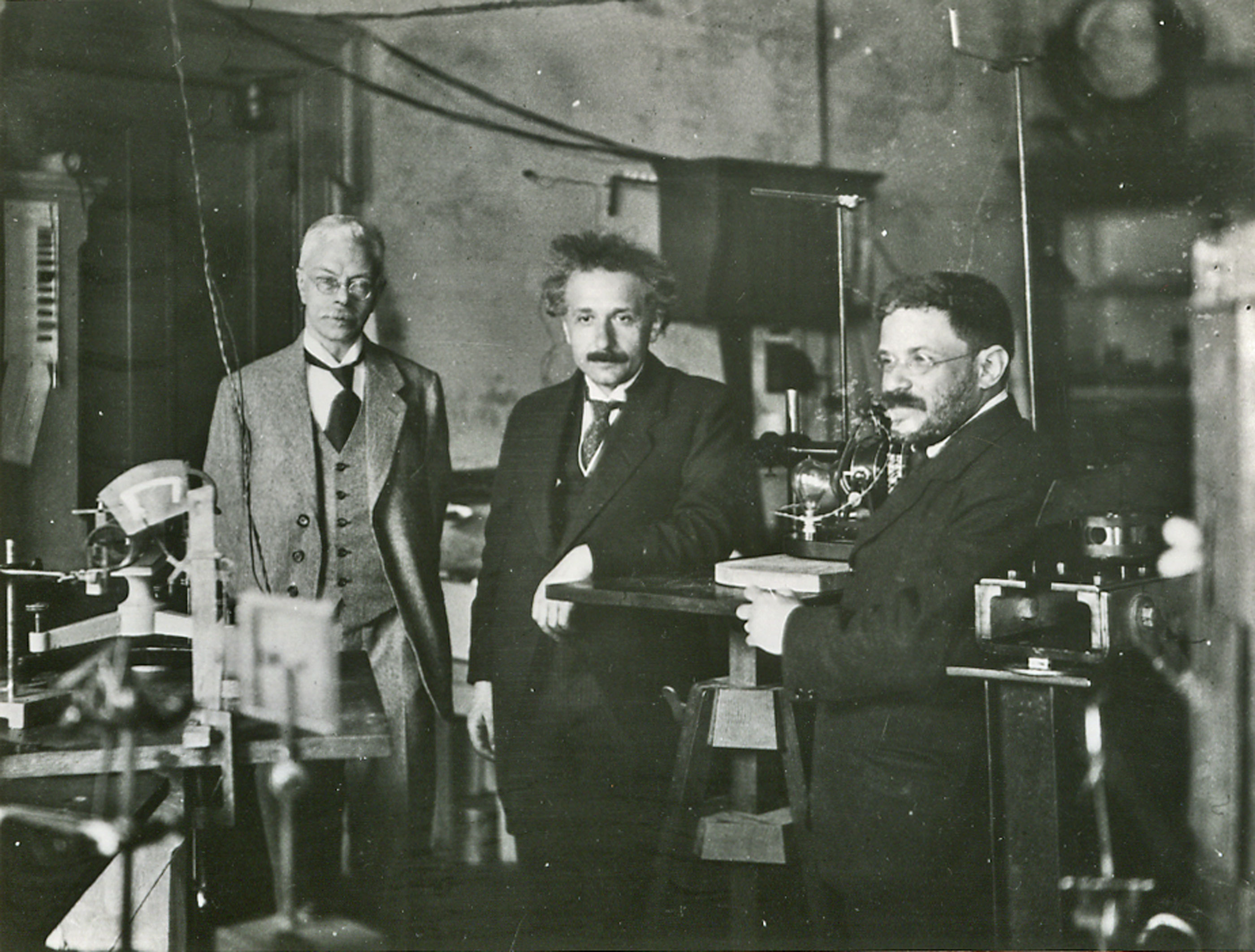
Discoverer of the Zeeman effect, Pieter Zeeman with Albert Einstein and Paul Ehrenfest in his laboratory in Amsterdam (circa 1920).

The Zeeman effect, named after the Dutch physicist Pieter Zeeman, is the effect of splitting a spectral line into several components in the presence of a static magnetic field. It is analogous to the Stark effect, the splitting of a spectral line into several components in the presence of an electric field. Also similar to the Stark effect, transitions between different components have, in general, different intensities, with some being entirely forbidden (in the dipole approximation), as governed by the selection rules.

Since the distance between the Zeeman sub-levels is a function of the magnetic field, this effect can be used to measure the magnetic field, e.g. that of the Sun and other stars or in laboratory plasmas. The Zeeman effect is important in applications such as nuclear magnetic resonance spectroscopy, electron spin resonance spectroscopy, magnetic resonance imaging (MRI) and Mössbauer spectroscopy. It may also be utilized to improve accuracy in atomic absorption spectroscopy.

A theory about the magnetic sense of birds assumes that a protein in the retina is changed due to the Zeeman effect.

When the spectral lines are absorption lines, the effect is called inverse Zeeman effect.

==== Liquid helium (liquefaction of helium) (1908) ====
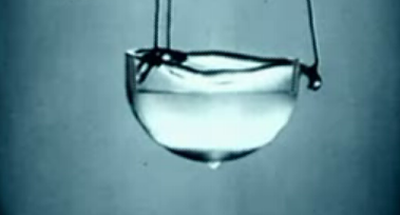
Liquid helium in a cup.

Helium was first liquefied (liquid helium) on 10 July 1908, by Dutch physicist Heike Kamerlingh Onnes. With the production of liquid helium, it was said that "the coldest place on Earth" was in Leiden.

==== Superconductivity (1911) ====
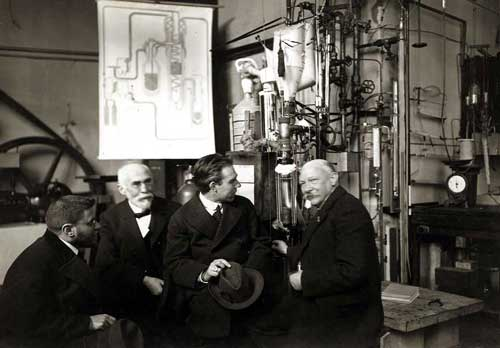
Paul Ehrenfest, Hendrik Lorentz and Niels Bohr visit Heike Kamerlingh Onnes in the cryogenic lab (where Onnes discovered the phenomenon of superconductivity in 1911).

Superconductivity, the ability of certain materials to conduct electricity with little or no resistance, was discovered by Dutch physicist Heike Kamerlingh Onnes.

==== Einstein–de Haas effect (1910s) ====
The Einstein–de Haas effect or the Richardson effect (after Owen Willans Richardson), is a physical phenomenon delineated by Albert Einstein and Wander Johannes de Haas in the mid-1910s, that exposes a relationship between magnetism, angular momentum, and the spin of elementary particles.

==== Debye model (1912) ====
In thermodynamics and solid state physics, the Debye model is a method developed by Peter Debye in 1912 for estimating the phonon contribution to the specific heat (heat capacity) in a solid. It treats the vibrations of the atomic lattice (heat) as phonons in a box, in contrast to the Einstein model, which treats the solid as many individual, non-interacting quantum harmonic oscillators. The Debye model correctly predicts the low temperature dependence of the heat capacity.

==== De Sitter precession (1916) ====
The geodetic effect (also known as geodetic precession, de Sitter precession or de Sitter effect) represents the effect of the curvature of spacetime, predicted by general relativity, on a vector carried along with an orbiting body. The geodetic effect was first predicted by Willem de Sitter in 1916, who provided relativistic corrections to the Earth–Moon system's motion.

==== De Sitter space and anti-de Sitter space (1920s) ====
In mathematics and physics, a de Sitter space is the analog in Minkowski space, or spacetime, of a sphere in ordinary, Euclidean space. The n-dimensional de Sitter space, denoted dS_{n}, is the Lorentzian manifold analog of an n-sphere (with its canonical Riemannian metric); it is maximally symmetric, has constant positive curvature, and is simply connected for n at least 3. The de Sitter space, as well as the anti-de Sitter space is named after Willem de Sitter (1872–1934), professor of astronomy at Leiden University and director of the Leiden Observatory. Willem de Sitter and Albert Einstein worked in the 1920s in Leiden closely together on the spacetime structure of our universe. De Sitter space was discovered by Willem de Sitter, and, at the same time, independently by Tullio Levi-Civita.

==== Van der Pol oscillator (1920) ====
In dynamical systems, a Van der Pol oscillator is a non-conservative oscillator with non-linear damping. It was originally proposed by Dutch physicist Balthasar van der Pol while he was working at Philips in 1920. Van der Pol studied a differential equation that describes the circuit of a vacuum tube. It has been used to model other phenomenon such as human heartbeats by colleague Jan van der Mark.

==== Kramers' opacity law (1923) ====
Kramers' opacity law describes the opacity of a medium in terms of the ambient density and temperature, assuming that the opacity is dominated by bound-free absorption (the absorption of light during ionization of a bound electron) or free-free absorption (the absorption of light when scattering a free ion, also called bremsstrahlung). It is often used to model radiative transfer, particularly in stellar atmospheres. The relation is named after the Dutch physicist Hendrik Kramers, who first derived the form in 1923.

==== Electron spin (1925) ====
In 1925, Dutch physicists George Eugene Uhlenbeck and Samuel Goudsmit co-discovered the concept of electron spin, which posits an intrinsic angular momentum for all electrons.

==== Solidification of helium (1926) ====
In 1926, Onnes' student, Dutch physicist Willem Hendrik Keesom, invented a method to freeze liquid helium and was the first person who was able to solidify the noble gas.

==== Ehrenfest theorem (1927) ====
The Ehrenfest theorem, named after the Austrian-born Dutch-Jew theoretical physicist Paul Ehrenfest at Leiden University.

==== De Haas–van Alphen effect (1930) ====
The de Haas–van Alphen effect, often abbreviated to dHvA, is a quantum mechanical effect in which the magnetic moment of a pure metal crystal oscillates as the intensity of an applied magnetic field B is increased. It was discovered in 1930 by Wander Johannes de Haas and his student P. M. van Alphen.

==== Shubnikov–de Haas effect (1930) ====
The Shubnikov–de Haas effect (ShdH) is named after Dutch physicist Wander Johannes de Haas and Russian physicist Lev Shubnikov.

==== Kramers degeneracy theorem (1930) ====
In quantum mechanics, the Kramers degeneracy theorem states that for every energy eigenstate of a time-reversal symmetric system with half-integer total spin, there is at least one more eigenstate with the same energy. It was first discovered in 1930 by H. A. Kramers as a consequence of the Breit equation.

==== Minnaert resonance frequency (1933) ====
In 1933, Marcel Minnaert published a solution for the acoustic resonance frequency of a single bubble in water, the so-called Minnaert resonance. The Minnaert resonance or Minnaert frequency is the acoustic resonance frequency of a single bubble in an infinite domain of water (neglecting the effects of surface tension and viscous attenuation).

==== Casimir effect (1948) ====
In quantum field theory, the Casimir effect and the Casimir–Polder force are physical forces arising from a quantized field. Dutch physicists Hendrik Casimir and Dirk Polder at Philips Research Labs proposed the existence of a force between two polarizable atoms and between such an atom and a conducting plate in 1947. After a conversation with Niels Bohr who suggested it had something to do with zero-point energy, Casimir alone formulated the theory predicting a force between neutral conducting plates in 1948; the former is called the Casimir–Polder force while the latter is the Casimir effect in the narrow sense.

==== Tellegen's theorem (1952) ====
Tellegen's theorem is one of the most powerful theorems in network theory. Most of the energy distribution theorems and extremum principles in network theory can be derived from it. It was published in 1952 by Bernard Tellegen. Fundamentally, Tellegen's theorem gives a simple relation between magnitudes that satisfy Kirchhoff's laws of electrical circuit theory.

==== Stochastic cooling (1970s) ====
In the early 1970s Simon van der Meer, a Dutch particle physicist at CERN, discovered this technique to concentrate proton and anti-proton beams, leading to the discovery of the W and Z particles. He won the 1984 Nobel Prize in Physics together with Carlo Rubbia.

==== Renormalization of gauge theories (1971) ====
In 1971, Gerardus 't Hooft, who was completing his PhD under the supervision of Dutch theoretical physicist Martinus Veltman, renormalized Yang–Mills theory. They showed that if the symmetries of Yang–Mills theory were to be realized in the spontaneously broken mode, referred to as the Higgs mechanism, then Yang–Mills theory can be renormalized. Renormalization of Yang–Mills theory is considered as a major achievement of twentieth century physics.

==== Holographic principle (1993) ====
The holographic principle is a property of string theories and a supposed property of quantum gravity that states that the description of a volume of space can be thought of as encoded on a boundary to the region – preferably a light-like boundary like a gravitational horizon. In 1993, Dutch theoretical physicist Gerard 't Hooft proposed what is now known as the holographic principle. It was given a precise string-theory interpretation by Leonard Susskind who combined his ideas with previous ones of 't Hooft and Charles Thorn.
