= Oudemans =

Oudemans is a surname. Notable people with the surname include:

- Anthonie Cornelis Oudemans (1858–1943), Dutch zoologist, son of Jean
- Corneille Antoine Jean Abram Oudemans (1825–1906), Dutch botanist and physician
- Jean Abraham Chrétien Oudemans (1827–1906), Dutch astronomer
  - Oudemans (crater), a crater on Mars named after Jean Abraham Chrétien Oudemans
