= Sonnenborgh =

Sonnenborgh can refer to:

- Sonnenborgh Observatory, Utrecht, the Netherlands
- Minor planet Sonnenborgh named after the Sonnenborgh Observatory
