= Lists of Dutch inventions and discoveries =

The Netherlands and its people have made contributions to the arts, science, technology and engineering, economics and finance, cartography and geography, exploration and navigation, law and jurisprudence, thought and philosophy, medicine. and agriculture. The following list is composed of objects, (largely) unknown lands, breakthrough ideas/concepts, principles, phenomena, processes, methods, techniques, styles that were discovered or invented by people from the Netherlands.

== Lists ==
- List of Dutch inventions and innovations
- List of Dutch discoveries
- List of Dutch explorations

== See also ==
- List of place names of Dutch origin
- Australian places with Dutch names
- Toponymy of New Netherland
- New Holland
- List of English words of Dutch origin
- Japanese words of Dutch origin
