= Alberda =

Alberda is a surname. Notable people with the surname include:

- Joop Alberda (born 1952), Dutch volleyball coach
- Willem Alberda van Ekenstein (1858–1937), Dutch chemist
