= Utrecht Atlas =

- Author: Marcel Minnaert; Gerard Mulders; Jakob Houtgast
- Original title: Photometric Atlas of the Solar Spectrum from λ3612 to λ8771 with an Appendix from λ3332 to λ3637
- Subject: Solar observation; Solar physics
- Publisher: Sterrewacht "Sonnenborgh"
- Publication date: 1940
- Publication place: Netherlands
- Pages: 174 pages of microphotometer tracings with an introduction in English and Esperanto

The Utrecht Atlas of the solar spectrum is a detailed inventory in graphical form of spectral lines observed in sunlight at the Sonnenborgh Observatory. The visible spectrum is about 390 to 700 nm and the atlas covers from 361.2 to 877.1 nm (plus an appendix) so that the atlas has some coverage of the infrared and ultraviolet spectrum of sunlight. The atlas, compiled by Minnaert and his students Mulders and Houtgast, was published in 1940 shortly before the WWII invasion of the Netherlands.

A reviewer's description of the atlas states:

The Atlas contains intensity curves covering the complete solar spectrum from λ 3612 to λ 8771 based on photographs taken at the Mount Wilson Observatory together with an appendix covering the region λ 3332 to λ 3637 as derived from plates secured at Utrecht. The scale in wave length is about 20 millimeters per angstrom so that the spectrum is represented on a map about 360 feet long. The curves are printed in black on millimeter paper with blue lines. The intensity scale is such that a vertical range of 100 millimeters corresponds to the difference between zero intensity and the continuous background.

Astronomer John Hearnshaw wrote:

The atlas had a huge influence on solar and stellar high resolution spectroscopy after World War II.

== History ==
In the early nineteenth century, Joseph von Fraunhofer made the first systematic inventory of spectral lines in sunlight. Full understanding of the significance of Fraunhofer lines required a huge amount of pioneering research in astrophysics and quantum theory. Cecilia Payne (1925) demonstrated that variations in stellar line strengths can be explained by the Saha ionization equation. Payne's work lead to a major study of the chemical abundances in the solar atmosphere undertaken by H. N. Russell, Walter S. Adams, and Charlotte Moore. Around 1930, the procedures developed by Russell, Adams, and Moore were adapted by Minnaert and Mulders for determining chemical abundances in stellar photospheres. Houtgast invented a modification of Moll's microphotometer that Minnaert, Mulders, and Houtgast employed to make direct registrations of the solar line intensities.

According to Minnaert at a seminar on the occasion of his 70th birthday:

In 1936 Mulders went to the Mt Wilson Observatory and took the plates for our Photometric Atlas, while Houtgast developed the modified, home-made instrument, which could be added to the microphotometer and gave direct intensity readings. All microphotometer curves were obtained by direct photographic recording; we worked mostly in the night, because then the microphotometer was free. You were alone in the building, and in the silence of the darkroom, in the dull red light, you were developing your record. There it emerged, slowly emerged, out of nothingness, and as if by magic there appeared on the paper the profile of the cyanogen band, or of the atmospheric oxygen lines, never earlier observed in their true quantitative shape.
