= Marcel Minnaert =

Belgian-Dutch astronomer (1893–1970)

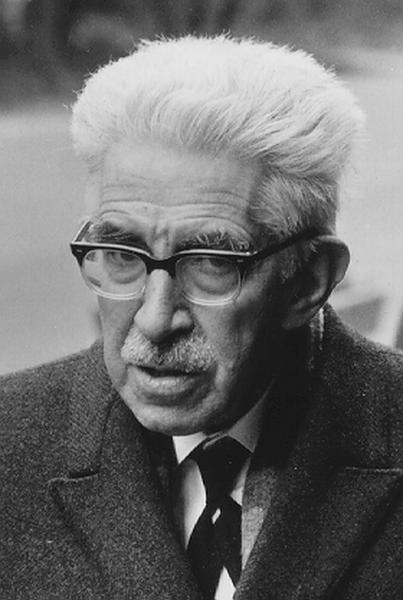
- Minnaert in 1967
- Born: Marcel Gilles Jozef Minnaert; 12 February 1893; Bruges, Belgium
- Died: 10 October 1970 (aged 77); Utrecht, Netherlands
- Education: Ghent University; Utrecht University
- Known for: Minnaert resonance Minnaert function
- Awards: Prix Jules Janssen (1966); Bruce Medal (1951); Gold Medal of RAS (1947)
- Scientific career
- Fields: Astronomy
- Workplaces: Utrecht University
- Doctoral advisor: Leonard Ornstein
- Doctoral students: Hendrik C. van de Hulst; Kees de Jager

Marcel Gilles Jozef Minnaert (12 February 1893 – 26 October 1970) was a Belgian-Dutch astronomer. He was born in Bruges and died in Utrecht. He is notable for his contributions to astronomy and physics and for a popular book on meteorological optics: Light and colour in the open air, first published in English in 1940.

== Biography ==
Minnaert obtained a PhD in biology at Ghent University in 1914. Later he obtained also a PhD in physics from Utrecht University, under the supervision of Leonard Ornstein.

He was a supporter of the Flemish movement during World War I and endorsed the replacement of French by Dutch during the German occupation of Belgium. He worked as "lector fysica" at the new Flemish University of Ghent, which was made possible by the support of the German occupation forces, and was viewed as connivance with the enemy by the reestablished Belgian authorities. Because of this, he was sentenced after the war in absence to 15 years of forced labor. However, Minnaert had anticipated this outcome by fleeing Belgium in time.

In 1918, he found a position at Utrecht University in the Netherlands, initially to do photometric research. In Utrecht, he became interested in astronomy, and he became a pioneer of solar research. He specialized in spectroscopy and the study of stellar atmospheres and invented the spectroscopic curve of growth.

Minnaert was also interested in bubbles and musical nature of the sounds made by running water. In 1933 he published a solution for the acoustic resonance frequency of a single bubble in water, the so-called Minnaert resonance.

In 1937, he was appointed director of the stellar observatory Sonnenborgh in Utrecht and full professor in astronomy at the university. In 1940, he published his famous Utrecht Atlas of the solar spectrum. In 1941, he invented the Minnaert function, which is used in optical measurements of celestial bodies.

During the German occupation of the Netherlands in World War II, he was imprisoned in Kamp Sint-Michielsgestel by the Germans because of his left-wing, anti-fascist sympathies. During his incarceration, he taught physics and astronomy to his fellow prisoners. After the War, he was one of the founders of the Mathematisch Centrum in Amsterdam.

Minnaert was elected to the American Academy of Arts and Sciences in 1959. In 1946 he became member of the Royal Netherlands Academy of Arts and Sciences. He became a member of the United States National Academy of Sciences in 1964 and the American Philosophical Society in 1969.

== Publications ==
- Practical Work in Elementary Astronomy, D. Reidel, 1969, ISBN 978-94-010-3416-6; 2012 pbk reprint

One of his interests was the effects of the atmosphere on light and images. His classic book on this subject, the first part of a trilogy, was originally published in Dutch in 1937 as:

- De natuurkunde van 't vrije veld. Licht en kleur in het landschap. It was released in English translation as:
- Light and colour in the open air (H. M. Kremer-Priest, Trans.). London: G. Bell and Sons. An edition of this book was reprinted in 1954, as a Dover reprint:
- The Nature of Light and Color in the Open Air, Dover, 1954, ISBN 0-486-20196-1 and in a new translation with color photographs as:
- Light and Color in the Outdoors, Springer, 1993, ISBN 0-387-97935-2, ISBN 3-540-97935-2, ISBN 0-387-94413-3.

== Honors ==
Awards

- Gold Medal of the Royal Astronomical Society (1947)
- Bruce Medal (1951)
- Prix Jules Janssen of the Société astronomique de France (1966)

Named after him

- Asteroid 1670 Minnaert
- Minnaert (crater) on the Moon
- Minnaert building of the Uithof campus of Utrecht University
- Minnaert function
- Minnaert resonance
