= Johann Conrad Barchusen =

German chemist (1666–1723)

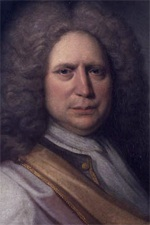
- Born: 16 March 1666; Horn, Principality of Lippe, Holy Roman Empire
- Died: 2 October 1723 (aged 57); Utrecht, Netherlands
- Scientific career
- Fields: Chemistry
- Workplaces: Utrecht University

Johann Conrad Barchusen, originally Barkhausen, sometimes Barchausen (16 March 1666 Horn, Principality of Lippe - 2 October 1723, Utrecht) was a pharmacist, chemist, physician and professor. At Universiteit Utrecht, he was the first person to teach chemistry as a specific subject (not just as part of medicine). He published four textbooks on chemistry and two on medicine.

== Life ==
Barchusen was the eldest son of the burgher Conrad Barkhausen and his wife Catharina Hedwig Barkhausen (born Eichhof). After the death of his parents, Johann Conrad Barchusen lived with his uncle Franz Caspar Barkhausen (1636-1715). Franz Caspar Barkhausen was a jurist, archivist and librarian who lived in Detmold. While living with him, Johann Barchusen learned Latin and Greek. He served an apprenticeship as a pharmacist in Berlin, Mainz and Vienna.

In 1690, his first book, Pharmacopoeus synopticus, appeared. The pharmaceutical textbook had two further editions during his lifetime. In 1693 he returned to Horn, but found no prospects there as a pharmacist. He traveled to Hungary and became a physician of the Venetian Doge and naval commander Francesco Morosini. Barchusen accompanied Morosini on a military expedition to Morea but the 75-year-old Morosini died January 1694 in Nafplion.

On 16 September 1694 the city council of Utrecht granted Barchusen the right to teach private chemistry courses which could be attended by students of the university. Because he did not have a medical degree, he could not be formally appointed as a professor at the university: his type of specialist was not yet recognized by the university. His courses were so successful that the magistrate, by decision of 8 April 1695, financed construction of a chemical laboratory in the bastion of what was then the fortress of Sonnenborgh. In May 1698 the council voted to increase Barchusen's salary, but continued to debate the issue of an appropriate appointment. On 29 August 1698 Barchusen was appointed to the position of lecturer. On 3 October 1698 the University Senate agreed to award him a Doctor of Medicine on an honorary basis, "on account of his erudition and of the excellent private and public testimonies to his skill in medicine and chemistry", giving him the formal status to support a faculty position. On 19 March 1703 he was appointed extraordinary professor of chemistry, the first person in Utrecht to be given this rank. At university commencement on 21 June 1703 he spoke on the history of chemistry. He continued his teaching activities until his death in 1723.

On 13 December 1699 Barchusen married Maria Johanna Pijlsweert (variously Pylsweert, d. 1717), daughter of a wealthy Utrecht family. Their only son Conrad was born the following year, but he died as a child.

== Research ==
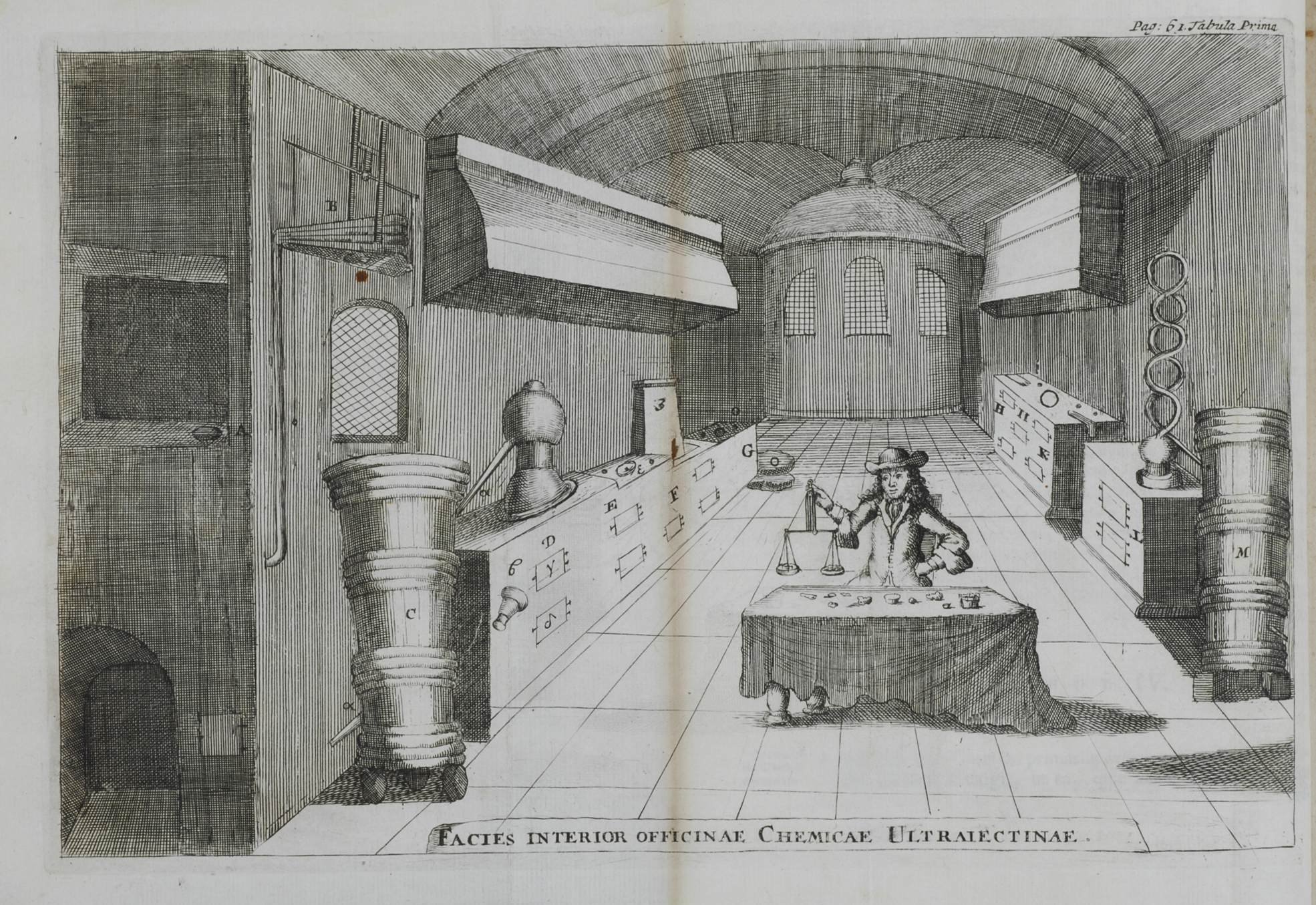
Barchusen's Laboratory, Elementa chemiae, 1718

Barchusen was one of the first representatives of the university to focus on teaching chemistry, which up to that time had been regarded as a sub-area of medicine. During his lifetime, Barchusen taught chemistry exclusively and wrote four textbooks in chemistry and two in medicine. His viewpoint was broader than most of his contemporaries, placing chemistry in the context of natural philosophy and the composition of matter, rather than medicine.

Barchusen stated that the aim of chemistry was to "demonstrate how 'sublunary bodies can be reduced into four different substances or principles: namely salt, oil, water, and earth; and [how] these [can be] examined within various mixtures and combinations by the work of different fires and procedures." Barchusen divided chemistry into three parts: docimastica (metallurgy and assay), medica or iatro-chemia (medicinal chemistry), and alchemistica or hermetica (transformation of metals) which he stated was "knowledge based in fables".

Barchusen emphasized methods and laboratory techniques, describing in detail the tasks which a chemistry student should be able to carry out: the use of fires and specific procedures such as distillation, incineration, putrefaction, evaporation and fermentation to examine mixtures of the four substances and their chemical composition. He also gave extensive descriptions of the proper construction and furnishing of a laboratory and the instruments to be used within it. Ample room must be given for furnaces, and a cistern with fresh water must be available. Barchusen classified instruments as "passive" (allowing existing events to occur) and "active" (changing the course of events which occurred).

Herman Boerhaave wrote approvingly of his work:

Jo. Conr. Barchausen, professor of chemistry at Utrecht, deserves well to be read. He is an honest writer, and sufficiently accurate; he delivers good matter in an excellent style, tho' his reasonings are not so much to our mind. His Elementa Chemiae are printed in 4to, and contain a great many particular experiments, and manual operations, no where else to be met withal.' – Herman Boerhaave, A new method of chemistry (London, 1727), p. 39

Barchusen and his students carried out analytical investigations of blood, urine, feces, and bile, all of which were considered important to medical practice. He was the first to study succinic acid.

Barchusen was also interested in botany. The Pippau plant or Crepis setosa was also called Barkhausia.

Barchusen left 165 botanical and scientific works from his personal collection to the University Library of Utrecht, along with a portrait of himself which is in the Universiteitsmuseum of Utrecht. His chemical laboratory in Utrecht was excavated by archaeologists as of 2000-2001 and items from it can be viewed at the Museum Sonnenborgh.

== Works ==
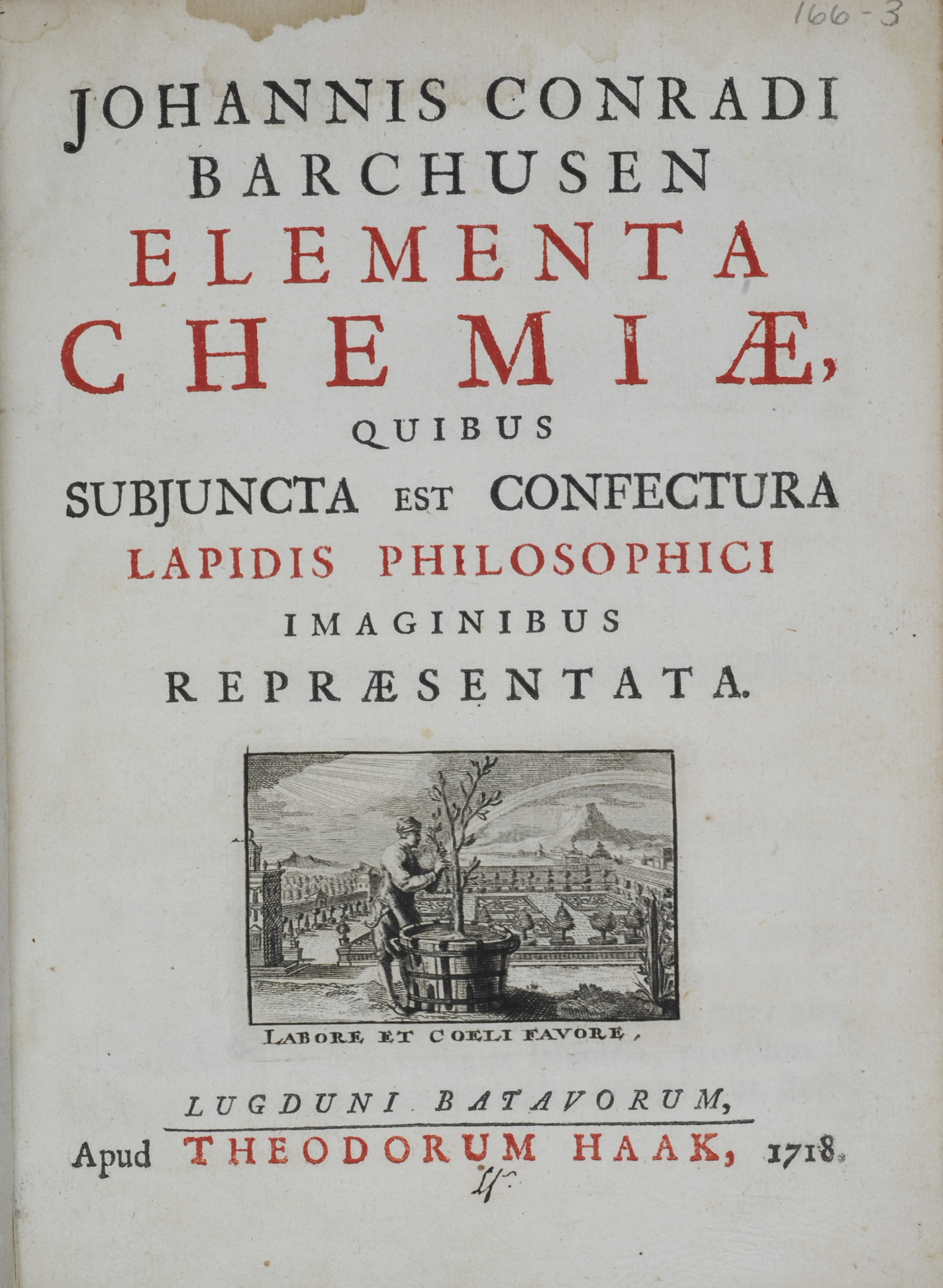
Title page, Elementa chemiae (1718)

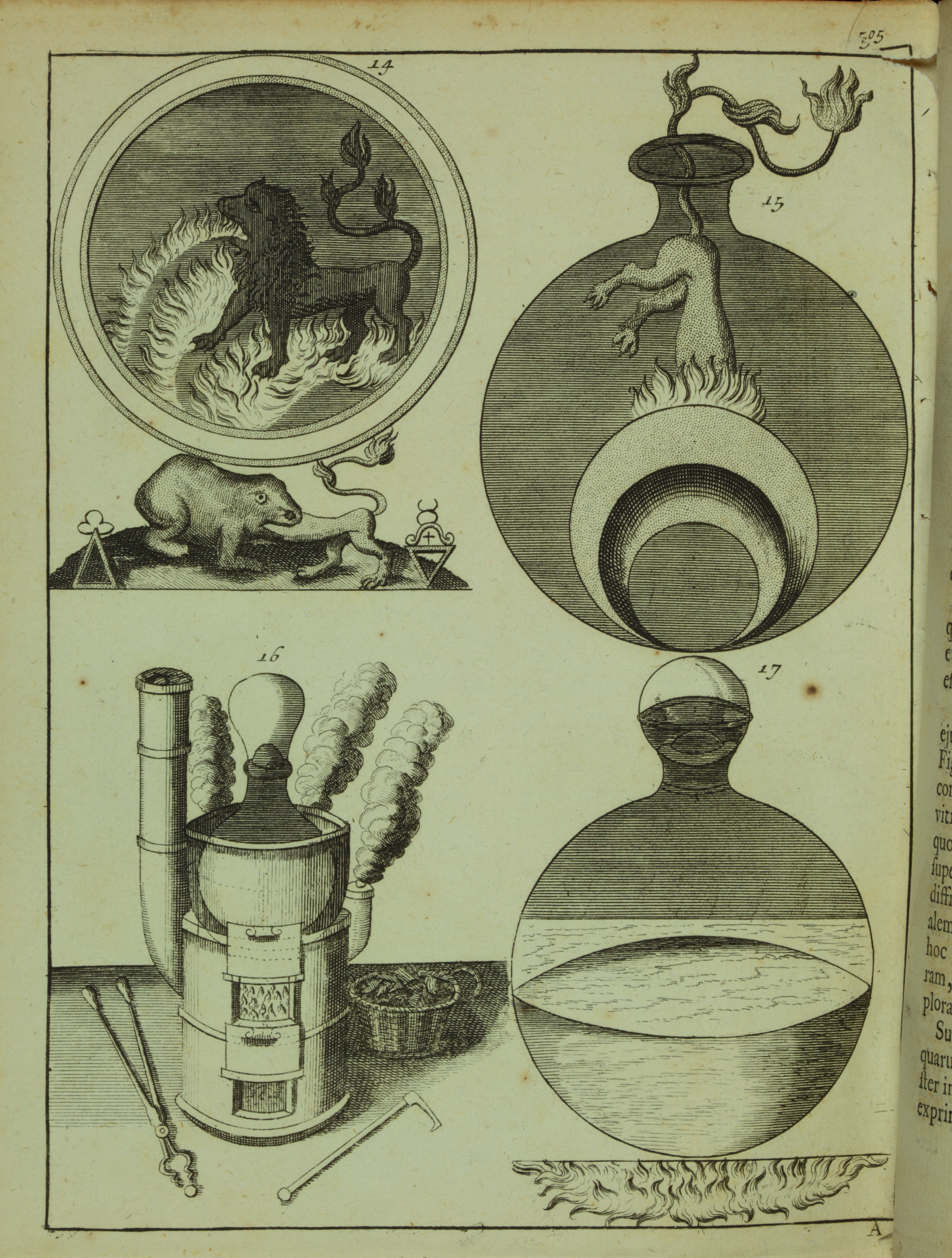
Alchemical images and chemical apparatus

His works appear under a number of variations of his name including Johannis Conradi Barchusen. Also, the title of the first edition sometimes differs from the title of later printings of the work. For example, his Elementa chemiæ (1718) was a second edition of Pyrosophia (1698), adding to the original work a collection of alchemical emblems copied from an alchemical manuscript, and adding information about the possible chemical apparatus involved in alchemical work.

- Chemistry
  - Pharmacopoeus synopticus, seu synopsis pharmaceutica, plerasque medicaminum, compositiones, ac formulas, eorumque... conficiendi methodum exhibens (Frankfurt, 1690; 2nd ed., Utrecht, 1696), 3rd ed. entitled Synopsis pharmaciae (Leiden, 1712)
  - Pyrosophia, succincte atque breviter iatrochemiam, rem metallicam et chrysopoeiam pervestigans. Opus medicis, phvsicis, chemicis, pharmacopoeis, metallicis ec. noninutile (Leiden, 1698), 2nd ed., rev., entitled Elementa chemiæ, quibus subjuncta est confectura lapidis philosophici imaginibus repraesentata (Leiden, 1718)
  - Acroamata, in quibus complura ad iatro-chemiam atque physicam spectantia. jocunda rerum varietate, explicantur (Utrecht, 1703)
  - Compendium ratiocinii chemici more geometrarum concinnatum (Leiden, 1712)
- Medicine
  - Historia medicinae (Amsterdam, 1710), 2nd ed., rev., entitled De medicinae origine et progressu dissertationes (Utrecht, 1723)
  - Collecta medicinae practicae generalis. Quibus subjunctus est Dialogus de optima medicorum secta (Amsterdam, 1715)
