= Jean Abraham Chrétien Oudemans =

Dutch astronomer

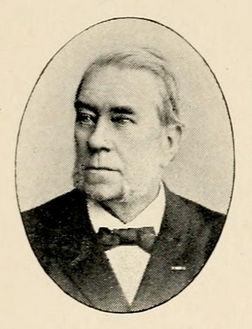

Jean Abraham Chrétien Oudemans (Amsterdam, 16 December 1827 – Utrecht, 14 December 1906) was a Dutch astronomer. He was the director of the Utrecht Observatory from 1875 until 1898, when he retired.

Oudemans was born in Amsterdam, son of the poet, teacher and philologist Anthonie Oudemans Sr. and Jacoba Adriana Hammecker. He entered Leiden University when he was just 16 as a student of the noted astronomer Frederik Kaiser. He became a high school teacher in Leiden when he was just 19 (1846). The next six years he worked on his dissertation on the determination of the latitude of Leiden. Next he studied asteroids and variable stars, meanwhile hoping for an academic appointment. In 1855 he became member of the Royal Netherlands Academy of Arts and Sciences.

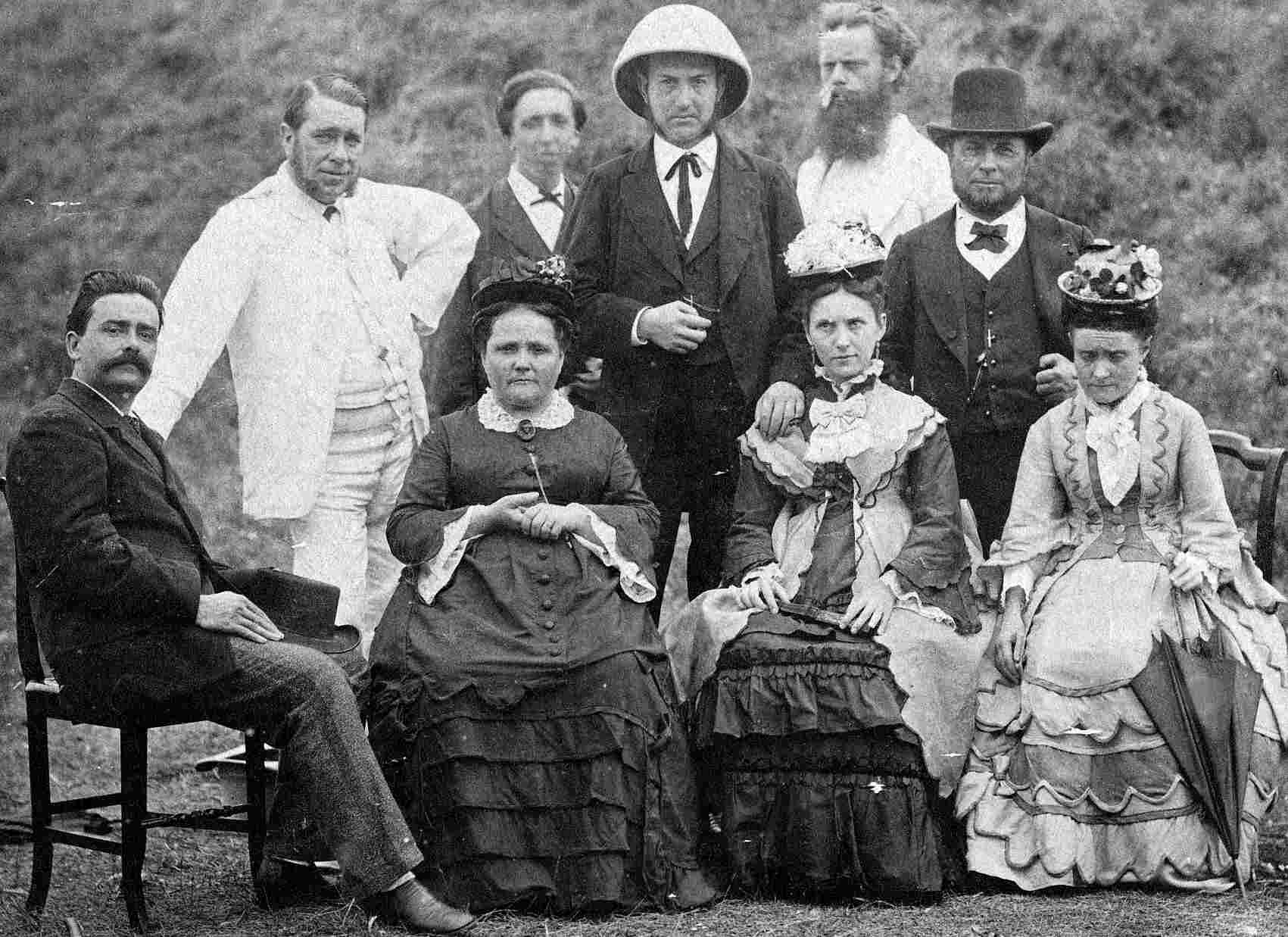
Oudemans expedition to Réunion in 1874

He married Pauline Adriana Verdam (the daughter of a well-known mathematics professor Gideon Jan Verdam) in 1856. In the same year he was appointed a professor at Utrecht University and became the first director of its observatory. However, his interest drew him towards geography. He traveled to the Dutch East Indies as head surveyor, and worked in that capacity for 18 years, publishing his works on the triangulation of the island of Java in six books.

In 1874 he organized an astronomical expedition to the island of Réunion to observe the transit of Venus but, due to bad weather, the results were disappointing.

Oudemans crater on Mars was named in his honor.

A brother was the botanist Corneille Antoine Jean Abram Oudemans. One of his sons was Anthonie Cornelis Oudemans Jzn, one of the fathers of cryptozoology.

== Sources ==
- Pyenson, L. (1989) Empire of Reason: Exact Sciences in Indonesia, 1840-1940, Brill, ISBN 90-04-08984-5, ISBN 978-90-04-08984-6, pp. 20–98
