= Cornelis Adriaan Lobry van Troostenburg de Bruyn =

Dutch chemist

Lobry de Bruyn
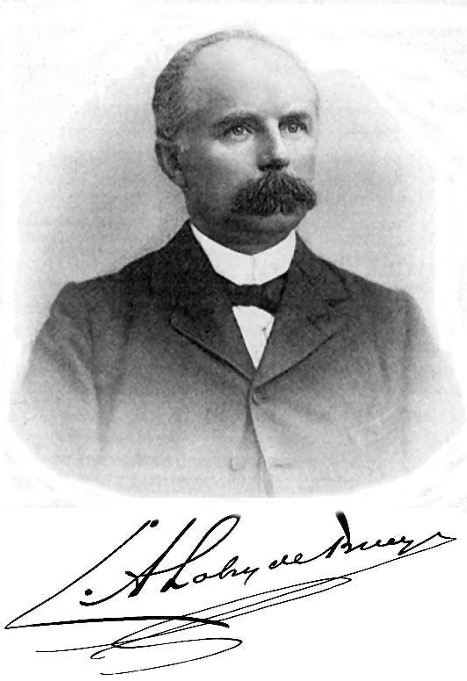
- Born: 1 January 1857; Leeuwarden, The Netherlands
- Died: 23 July 1904 (aged 47); Amsterdam, The Netherlands
- Known for: Lobry de Bruyn–van Ekenstein transformation
- Scientific career
- Fields: Chemistry

Cornelis Adriaan Lobry van Troostenburg de Bruyn (1 January 1857 – 23 July 1904) was a chemist from the Netherlands.

== Biography ==
De Bruyn was born in Leeuwarden, where his father, Nicholaas Lobry van Troostenburg de Bruyn, was a physician in practice. The boy was in due time sent to the high school of the town (Hogere Burgerschool ), and subsequently for a year to a gymnasium. In 1875, he entered the University of Leiden, and in 1883, while acting as assistant to Professor Franchimont, he produced his dissertation and obtained his doctorate. The subject of this thesis was the interaction of the three dinitrobenzenes with potassium cyanide in alcoholic solution, an investigation to which he several times returned, and the first results of which he published in 1904.

About this time De Bruyn went to Paris and worked for a few months in the laboratories of Charles-Adolphe Wurtz and of Charles Friedel, returning to Leiden in 1884, where he remained until the following year. Having been appointed as a chemist to the Government Department of Marine, his official duties naturally brought before his notice new problems, especially those connected with the manufacture and properties of explosives, and to this work he devoted much attention for 11 years. During this period he began the study of methyl and ethyl alcohols in the character of solvents, which led him on to the isolation of hydroxylamine and hydrazine. Neither of these bases had up to this time been obtained in a free state, owing probably to the use of water as the solvent. De Bruyn found that hydroxylamine hydrochloride dissolves in about six times its weight of absolute methyl alcohol, and that when mixed with the calculated quantity of sodium methoxide, also dissolved in methyl alcohol, sodium chloride is precipitated, and a solution of hydroxylamine is obtained.

In 1896, de Bruyn was appointed to succeed Gunning as Professor of organic chemistry and pharmacy in the University of Amsterdam, having declined the position of State Chemist offered to him in 1895 by the Government of the Transvaal. He also turned down offers of a professorship from the universities of Vienna in 1901 and Utrecht in 1902, in favor of staying in Amsterdam.

In 1884, de Bruyn married Maria Simon Thomas, daughter of H. E. Simon Thomas, Professor of Obstetrics and Gynecology in Leiden. They had two sons and two daughters.

== Scientific work ==
De Bruyn studied the three isomers of dinitrobenzene, setting the stage for the discovery of Meisenheimer complexes. In 1885 he, together with Willem Alberda van Ekenstein, discovered tautomerism in sugars, now known as the Lobry de Bruyn–van Ekenstein transformation. De Bruyn also investigated alkaloids and synthesized hydroxylamine (1891) and hydrazine (1894).
