= Minnaert function =

The Minnaert function is a photometric function used to interpret astronomical observations and remote sensing data for the Earth. It was named after the astronomer Marcel Minnaert. This function expresses the radiance factor (RADF) as a function the phase angle ($\alpha$), the photometric latitude ($\varphi$) and the photometric longitude ($\lambda$).

$$\text{RADF} = \frac{I}{F} = \pi~A_M~\mu_0^k~\mu^{k-1}$$

where $A_M$ is the Minnaert albedo, $k$ is an empirical parameter, $I$ is the scattered radiance in the direction $(\alpha,\varphi,\lambda)$, $\pi F$ is the incident radiance, and

$$\mu_0 = \cos\varphi~\cos(\alpha-\lambda) ~;~~ \mu = \cos\varphi~\cos\lambda ~.$$

The phase angle is the angle between the light source and the observer with the object as the center.

The assumptions made are:

- the surface is illuminated by a distant point source.
- the surface is isotropic and flat.

Minnaert's contribution is the introduction of the parameter $k$, having a value between 0 and 1, originally for a better interpretation of observations of the Moon. In remote sensing the use of this function is referred to as Minnaert topographic correction, a necessity when interpreting images of rough terrain.
