= Sonnenborgh Observatory =

Dutch observatory

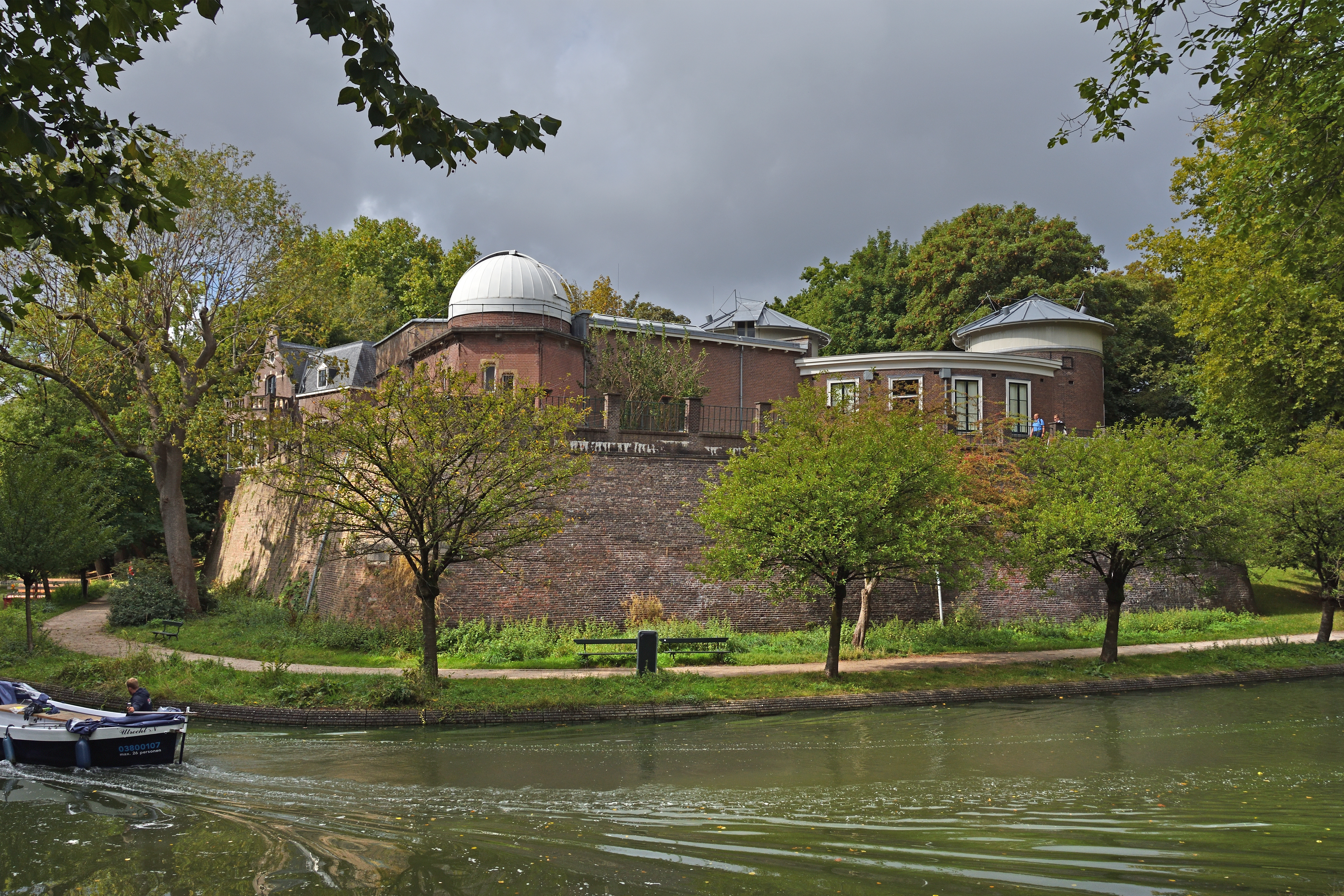
- Alternative names: Observatory Sonnenborgh
- Organization: University of Utrecht
- Observatory code: 015
- Location: Utrecht, Netherlands
- Coordinates: 52.08667°N 5.13000°E
- Established: 1853
- Website: www.sonnenborgh.nl
- Related media on Commons

Sonnenborgh Observatory (Dutch: Museum Sterrenwacht Sonnenborgh; Sonnenborgh museum & sterrenwacht; observatory code: 015) is an astronomical observatory and museum open to the public, located in Utrecht, Netherlands. It is located in one of the four stone forts built by Charles V as defense buildings for Utrecht. In 1639 the fort was expanded with an academic herbal garden by members of Utrecht University, three years after its founding. The garden was moved in 1724 to the current location of the Oude Hortus. During reconstruction works in 2001 remains were found of the first chemical laboratory in Utrecht, third in the world. The lab was led by the first chemistry-only professor in Utrecht Johann Conrad Barchusen.

The observatory was founded by C. H. D. Buys Ballot in 1853 as a university observatory (of the University of Utrecht) and from 1854 until 1897 it was the first home of the Royal Dutch Meteorological Institute. After the meteorological institute moved to de Bilt it was operated again by Utrecht University.

In 2013 its main function became a museum, organising viewing evenings for amateur astronomists. It is located on, what is now, the only surviving bastion of the city walls of Utrecht. Among the directors of the observatory were Jean Abraham Chrétien Oudemans, Martin Hoek, Albertus Antonie Nijland, Marcel Minnaert and Kees de Jager. The main topic of research was the Sun, which resulted in 1940 in the publication of the Utrecht Atlas of the solar spectrum.

In 2021, The European Physical Society (EPS) named it as an official EPS Historic Site.

== See also ==
- List of astronomical observatories
- List of astronomical societies
- Lists of telescopes
