= Lobry de Bruyn–Van Ekenstein transformation =

Rearrangement reaction

In carbohydrate chemistry, the Lobry de Bruyn–Van Ekenstein transformation also known as the Lobry de Bruyn–Alberda van Ekenstein transformation is the base or acid catalyzed transformation of an aldose into the ketose isomer or vice versa, with a tautomeric enediol as reaction intermediate. Ketoses may be transformed into 3-ketoses, etcetera. The enediol is also an intermediate for the epimerization of an aldose or ketose.

The reactions are usually base catalyzed, but can also take place under acid or neutral conditions. A typical rearrangement reaction is that between the aldose glyceraldehyde and the ketose dihydroxyacetone in a chemical equilibrium.

The Lobry de Bruyn–Van Ekenstein transformation is relevant for the industrial production of certain ketoses and was discovered in 1885 by Cornelis Adriaan Lobry van Troostenburg de Bruyn and Willem Alberda van Ekenstein.

== Aldose-ketose transformation ==
The following scheme describes the interconversion between an aldose and a ketose, where R is any organic residue.

The equilibrium or the reactant to product ratio depends on concentration, solvent, pH and temperature. At equilibrium the aldose and ketose form a mixture which in the case of the glyceraldehyde and dihydroxyacetone is also called glycerose.

A related reaction is the alpha-ketol rearrangement.

== Epimerization ==
The carbon atom at which the initial deprotonation takes place is a stereocenter. If, for example, D-glucose (an Aldose) rearranges to D-fructose, the ketose, the stereochemical configuration is lost in the enol form. In the chemical reaction the enol can be protonated from two faces, resulting in the backformation of glucose or the formation of the epimer D-mannose. The final product is a mix of D-glucose, D-fructose and D-mannose.

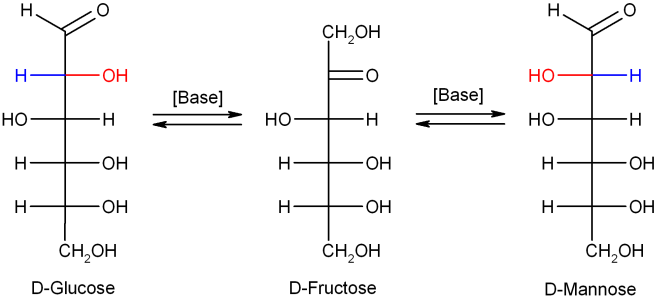

== Applications ==
Sugar Chemistry: Explains mutarotation and interconversion of Glucose ↔ Fructose ↔ Mannose.

Food Chemistry: Important in the alkaline degradation of Sugars and Caramelization.

Biological Relevance: Similar enediol intermediates appear in Glycolysis (via Isomerases).
