= Oudemans (crater) =

- Oudemans crater based on THEMIS day-time image
- Planet: Mars
- Coordinates: 10.0°S 91.9°W
- Quadrangle: Phoenicis Lacus
- Diameter: 124.0 km
- Eponym: Jean Abraham Chrétien Oudemans

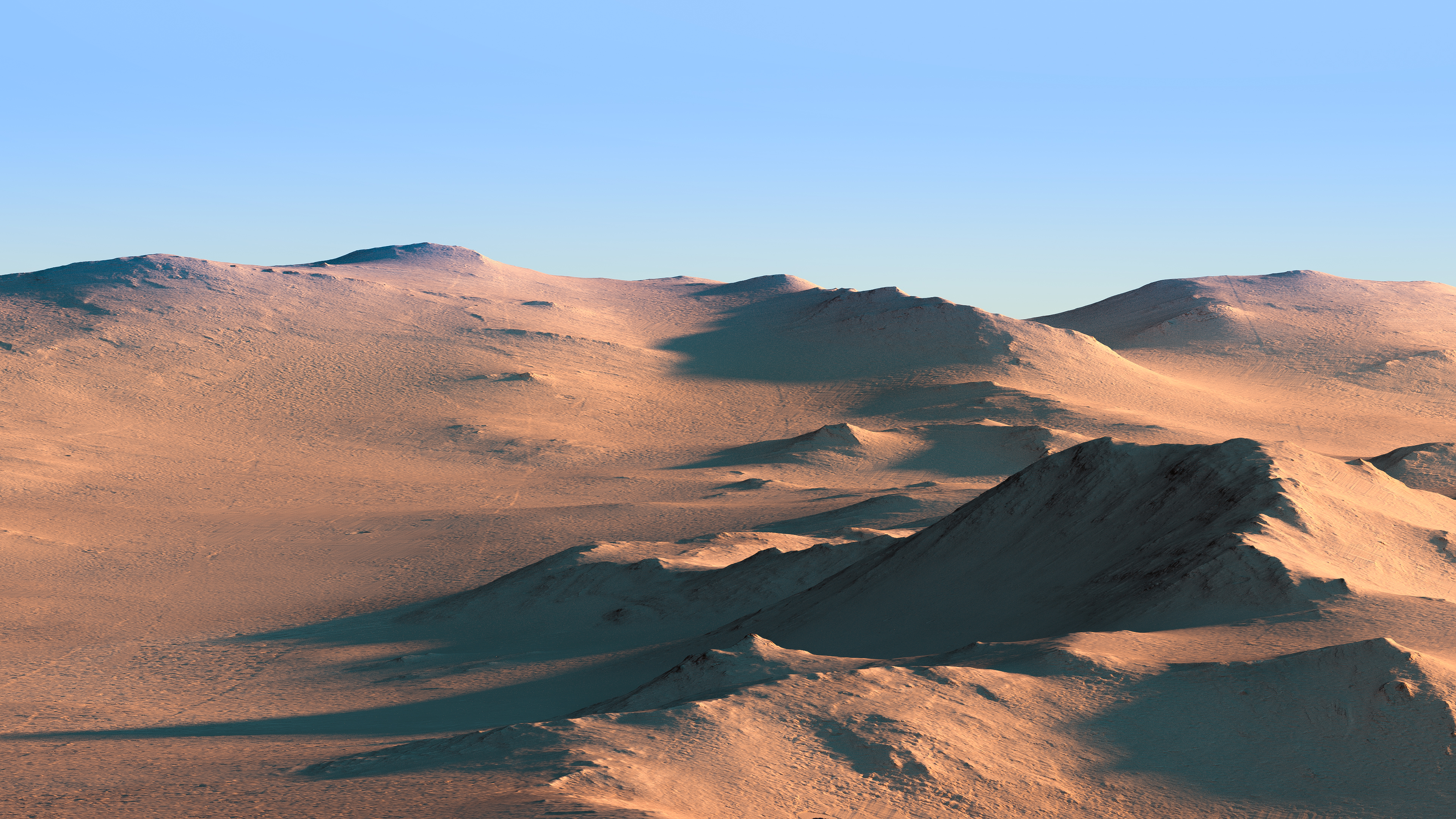
Oudemans crater central peak, rendering from HiRISE data

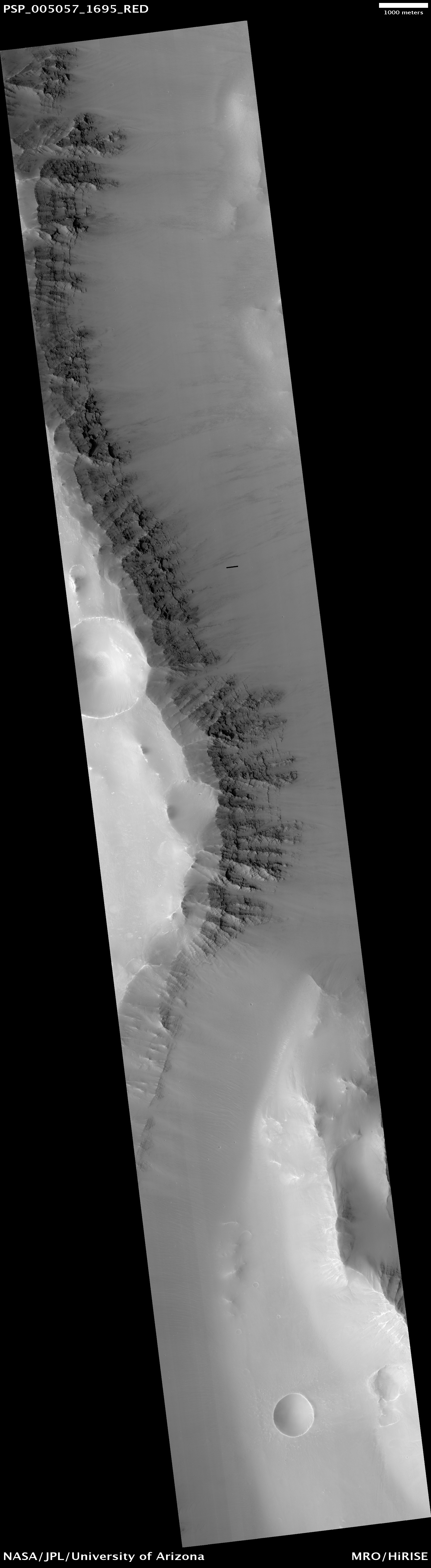
Layers in Oudemans crater wall, as seen by HiRISE. Click on image to see many fine layers in wall.

Oudemans is a crater on Mars, approximately 90 kilometers in diameter, named after Dutch astronomer Jean Abraham Chrétien Oudemans (1827–1906).

== Description ==
Oudemans crater is an example of very pristine morphology since small features in its ejecta and on its floor are preserved. Being young, it does not display water erosion on its rim. Unlike some craters, Oudemans crater does not have alluvial fans on its floor. In places, its rim has a terrace.

It is located in the Phoenicis Lacus quadrangle at 10.0 deg S, 92.1 deg W. This location puts it near the intersection of Noctis Labyrinthus and the Ius Chasma of the Valles Marineris rift system. It is approximately 90 km wide, indicating it was caused by a meteorite 4.5 km in diameter. Nick Hoffman proposes that this might be the trigger that caused the formation of the flow deposits on the east end of the Valles Marineris System. He proposes that the impact heated up subsurface carbon dioxide permafrost causing explosive decompression that flooded down the Valles Marineris into the Northern Plains of Mars.

The central uplift of Oudemans exposes layered rock that may be sedimentary. Layered rock exposed in the central uplifts are common in terrestrial impact structures, and there is abundant layering exposed in the nearby Valles Marineris canyon system suggesting that layered deposits extend throughout the region.

Oudemans' layers are from as deep or deeper than those exposed in Valles Marineris. A comparison of the layers in Valles Marineris and in the Oudemans central uplift may prove that they are similar rock types that share the same origin. Three other craters in the area, Martin (21.2°S, 290.7°E), Mazamba (27.3°S, 290.2°E) and a yet unnamed crater (28.4°S, 305°E) also possess finely layered materials in their central uplift features. The preservation of the layering and geographical occurrence of these four craters suggests that they could be ash layers deposited from numerous episodes from the Tharsis volcanoes. Voluminous volcanic episodes could have produced large volumes of layered rock that could have been rapidly buried and protected from cratering. The great detail available with HiRISE shows the layers to be both numerous and varied. Some layers are far harder than others because they form steep sides. Other layers form slopes. This same arrangement is common on the Earth. Steep slopes and slopes are easily observed in the walls of the Grand Canyon; slopes often occur when shale erodes into clay. If clay exists in some layers, then they were probably formed when water was present. Clay requires water to form. As such, the slopes may show periods of time when water covered the area. Perhaps life was abundant then. Click on the image below of the wall of Oudemans crater for a good view of these layers.
