= Corneille Antoine Jean Abram Oudemans =

Dutch botanist and physician

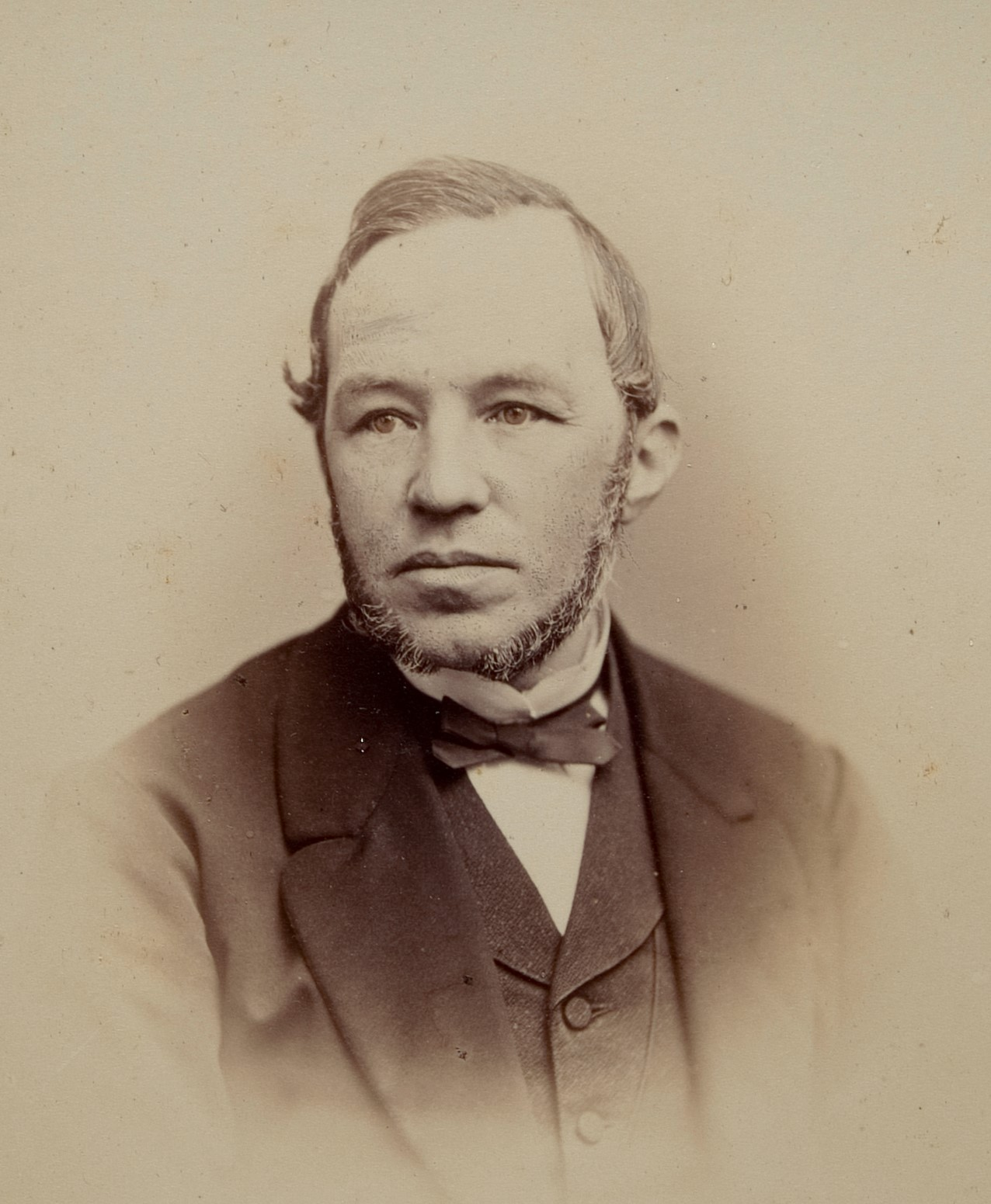
Portrait of C. A. J. A. Oudemans, ca. 1869

Corneille Antoine Jean Abram Oudemans or Cornelis Antoon Jan Abraham Oudemans (7 December 1825 – 29 August 1906) was a Dutch botanist and physician who specialized in fungal systematics.

Oudemans was born in Amsterdam, the oldest of seven children of his namesake teacher father and Jacoba Adriana Hammecker. A younger brother, Jean Abraham Chrétien became an astronomer and a nephew, Anthonie Cornelis, became a zoologist. Oudemans went to school in Weltevreden, Java, where his father taught and moved back to Amsterdam for classical studies. He then went to the University of Leiden where he received a medical degree in 1847. He travelled to Europe but he had to return due to the March Revolution. He became a lecturer in materia medica at Rotterdam where he also practiced medicine. He went to teach medicine at the Athenaeum of Amsterdam in 1859 and when it became a university in 1877 he was made rector magnificus. He became interested in the fungi and began to catalogue and describe them in Révision des champignons (1892–1897) and Catalogue raisonné (1904). Oudemans distributed two exsiccata-like series Herbarium Nederlandsche planten door C. A. J. A. Oudemans and Fungi Neerlandici exsiccati a C. A. J. A. Oudemans collecti. He retired in 1896 but continued to describe the European parasitic fungi which was published posthumously as Enumeratio systematica fungorum by professor J. W. Moll of Groningen University.

The Malvaceae genus of Oudemansia (1854), (now a synonym of Helicteres,) was named after him as is the mushroom Oudemansiella (1881).
