= Minnaert resonance =

Sound of a drop of water falling into water

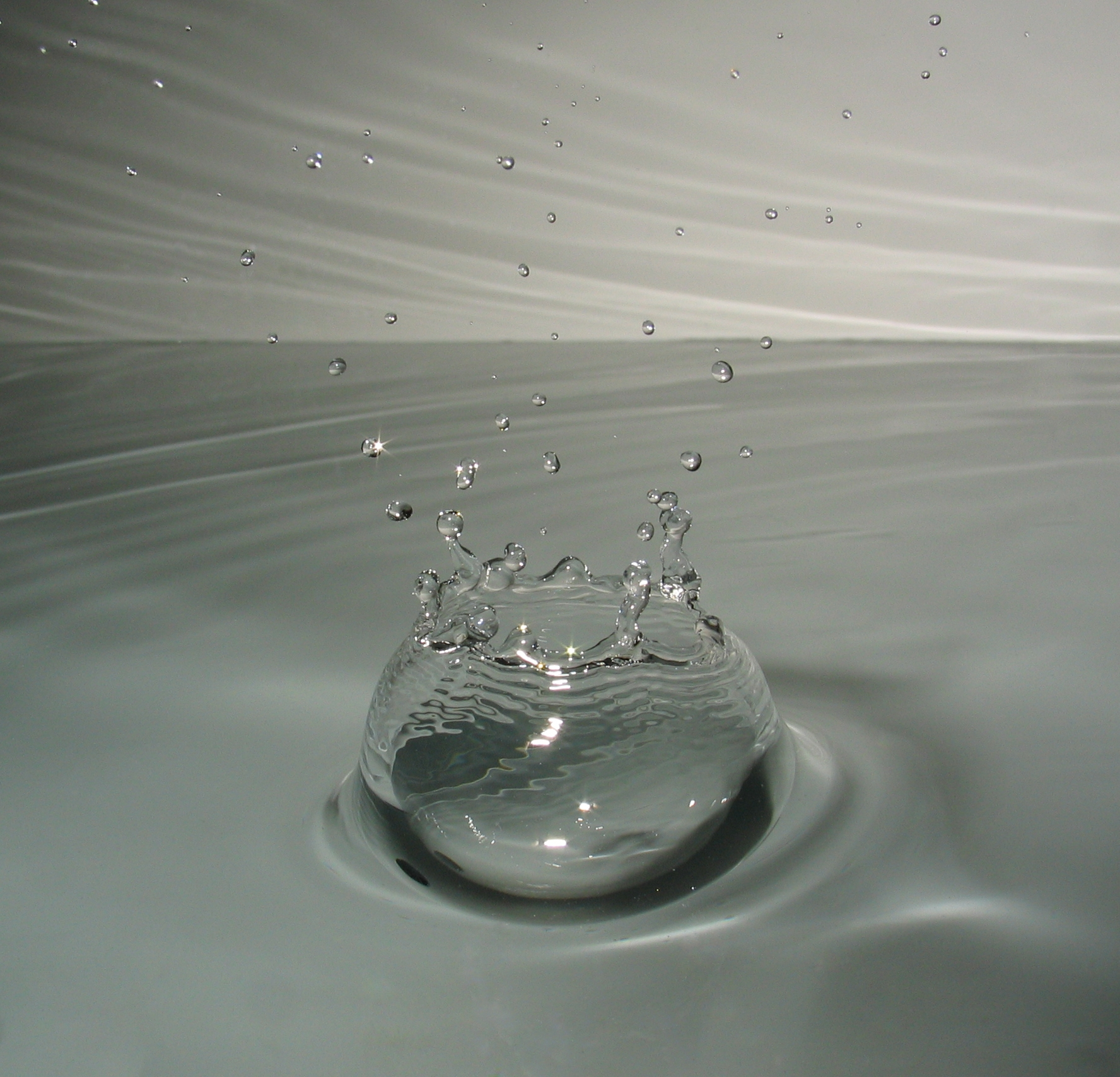

The Minnaert resonance is a phenomenon associated with a gas bubble pulsating at its natural frequency in a liquid, neglecting the effects of surface tension and viscous attenuation. It is the frequency of the sound made by a drop of water from a tap falling in water underneath, trapping a bubble of air as it falls. The natural frequency of the entrapped air bubble in the water is given by

$$f = \cfrac{1}{2\pi a}\left(\cfrac{3\gamma~p_A}{\rho}\right)^{1/2}$$

where $a$ is the radius of the bubble, $\gamma$ is the polytropic coefficient, $p_A$ is the ambient pressure, and $\rho$ is the density of water. This formula can also be used to find the natural frequency of a bubble cloud with $a$ as the radius of the cloud and $\rho$ the difference between the density of water and the bulk density of the cloud. For a single bubble in water at standard pressure $(p_A=100~ {\rm kPa}, ~ \rho=1000~ {\rm kg/m^3})$, this equation reduces to $f a \approx 3.26~m/s$, where $f~$ is the natural frequency of the bubble. The Minnaert formula assumes an ideal gas. However, it can be modified to account for deviations from real gas behavior by accounting for the gas compressibility factor, or the gas bulk modulus $K = \rho_g c_g^2$

$$f = \cfrac{1}{2\pi a}\left(\cfrac{3 K}{\rho}\right)^{1/2}$$

$\rho_g$ and $c_g^2$ being respectively the density and the speed of sound in the bubble.
