= Willem Alberda van Ekenstein =

Dutch chemist

- Born: March 28, 1858; Groningen
- Died: May 5, 1937 (aged 79); Marum
- Education: Delft University of Technology
- Known for: Lobry de Bruyn–van Ekenstein transformation
- Scientific career
- Workplaces: University of Amsterdam, University of Groningen, Dutch National Sugar Laboratory

Willem Alberda van Ekenstein (March 28, 1858 – May 5, 1937) was a Dutch chemist and discovered the Lobry de Bruyn–van Ekenstein transformation together with Adriaan Lobry van Troostenburg de Bruyn.

Ekenstein studied chemistry from 1876 till 1879 at the Delft University of Technology later he worked at the University of Amsterdam, University of Groningen, Dutch National Sugar Laboratory in Amsterdam.
