= List of Utrecht University people =

Notable alumni, faculty and administrators of Utrecht University.

== Nobel Prize laureates ==
- Nicolaas Bloembergen, a Dutch-American physicist and National Medal of Science laureate
- Paul J. Crutzen, a Dutch chemist
- Peter Debye, a Dutch-American physicist and National Medal of Science laureate
- Christiaan Eijkman, a Dutch physician, pathologist
- Willem Einthoven, a Dutch physician, physicist
- Jacobus Henricus van 't Hoff, a Dutch chemist
- Gerard 't Hooft, a Dutch physicist and Wolf Prize laureate
- Tjalling Koopmans, a Dutch-American mathematician, physicist, economist
- Rudolf Magnus, a German pharmacologist (nominated)
- Wilhelm Röntgen, a German physicist
- Lavoslav Ruzicka, a Croatian-Swiss chemist
- Martinus J.G. Veltman, a Dutch physicist

== Academics ==
=== Astronomers and Physicists ===
- Amina Helmi is an Argentine astronomer, Spinoza Prize laureate
- Ed van den Heuvel a Dutch astronomer, Spinoza Prize laureate
- Jacobus Kapteyn, astronomer
- Pieter Kok, physicist
- Arie A. Kruithof, physicist
- Renate Loll, physicist
- Marcel Minnaert, astronomer
- Abraham Pais, physicist, science historian
- Erik Verlinde is a Dutch theoretical physicist and string theorist, Spinoza Prize laureate
- Cisca Wijmenga is a Dutch professor of Human Genetics, Spinoza Prize laureate

=== Computer scientists ===
- Max Welling, computer scientist, co-founder of Scyfer BV and an inventor of variational autoencoders (VAEs)
- Durk Kingma, computer scientist, co-founder of OpenAI
- Peter Braam, computer scientist, mathematician and entrepreneur
- Jan van Leeuwen, computer scientist
- Erik Meijer, computer scientist
- Mark Overmars, computer scientist

=== Scientists ===
- Henk Barendregt, Dutch logician, known for his work in lambda calculus and type theory.
- Johannes Martin Bijvoet, chemist
- Elisabeth Bik, microbiologist and science writer
- Pieter Boddaert, Dutch physician and naturalist.
- Debby Bogaert, professor of pediatrics
- Jan K. Buitelaar, medical doctor, psychiatrist, author, and academic
- C.H.D. Buys Ballot, meteorologist
- René Descartes, philosopher, mathematician
- Peter Hagoort is a Dutch neuroscientist who studies the neurobiology of language, Spinoza Prize laureate
- J. G. ten Houten, phytopathologist and botanist
- Aristid Lindenmayer, biologist
- Jack van Lint, mathematician
- Marjo van der Knaap is a Dutch professor of pediatric neurology, Spinoza Prize laureate
- Izaak Maurits Kolthoff, chemist
- Victor Jacob Koningsberger a Dutch botanist
- Andrea 't Mannetje, epidemiologist
- Jan Pol a Dutch-American veterinarian
- Jansje Gretha Schuiringa, one of first Dutch dentists, professor of prosthetic dentistry
- Marten Scheffer is a Dutch ecologist, Spinoza Prize laureate
- Johann Jakob Scheuchzer, physician, scientist
- Marie Beatrice Schol-Schwarz, phytopathologist
- Twie Giok Tjoa, organizational sociologist, feminist
- Frans de Waal, zoologist and ethologist
- Anne Wyllie, microbiologist

=== Other academics ===
- Han Baltussen, classicist and historian of ancient philosophy
- Nicholas Barbon, one of the first proponents of the free market
- René Descartes, French philosopher, scientist, and mathematician who developed the techniques of analytical geometry, was taught by Utrecht University professors.
- Charles III William, Margrave of Baden-Durlach, German Margrave of Baden-Durlach, who established the city Karlsruhe
- Yuri Bobbert, cybersecurity executive, academic, and entrepreneur
- Henk J. M. Bos, historian of mathematics
- Rutger Bregman (born 1988), historian
- Pieter Burmann the Younger, philologist
- Michael Clyne, linguist
- Deirdre Curtin, legal scholar, Spinoza Prize laureate
- Johann Georg Graevius, scholar
- Lodewijk Grondijs, Byzantologist, war correspondent
- Jacoba Hol, physical geographer
- Philip G. Kreyenbroek, Iranist
- Joep Leerssen is a Dutch comparatist and cultural historian, Spinoza Prize laureate
- John Henry Livingston, academic, fourth president of Rutgers University
- Heiko Oberman, historian
- Perizonius, scholar
- Maarten van Rossem, historian
- Jan Hendrik Scholten, theologian
- Boudewijn Sirks, specialist in Roman law
- Gerard Verschuuren, philosopher from the former Institute of Human Biology

== Royalty ==
Members of Dutch Royal Family

- Princess Irene of the Netherlands,
- Prince Pieter-Christiaan of Orange-Nassau, van Vollenhoven,
- Willem-Alexander of the Netherlands,
- Annemarie, Duchess of Parma

== Politicians ==
=== Prime Ministers of the Netherlands ===
- Dirk Jan de Geer,
- Jan de Quay,
- Charles Ruijs de Beerenbrouck,
- Joan Röell,
- Theo van Lynden van Sandenburg,
- Aeneas Mackay Jr;

=== Ministers of the Cabinet of the Netherlands ===
- 4 Ministers of Education of the Netherlands: Jan Rudolph Slotemaker de Bruïne, Marga Klompé, Theo Bot, Robbert Dijkgraaf;
- 5 Ministers of Finance of the Netherlands: Theo de Meester, Max Steenberghe, Piet Lieftinck, Frans Andriessen, Sigrid Kaag;
- 5 Ministers of Foreign Affairs: Herman Adriaan van Karnebeek, Pim van Boetzelaer van Oosterhout, Johan Beyen, Hans van den Broek, Tom de Bruijn;
- 4 Ministers of Justice and Security: Jan Donner, Josef van Schaik, Johan van Maarseveen, Job de Ruiter;
- 5 Ministers of the Interior and Kingdom Relations: Godert van der Capellen, Edzo Toxopeus, Henk Beernink, Jan de Koning, Klaas de Vries;
- 2 Ministers of Defence: Wim van Eekelen, Hans Hillen;
- 2 Ministers of Infrastructure: Henk Zeevalking, Cora van Nieuwenhuizen;
- 2 Ministers of Economic Affairs: Dionysius Koolen, Jan Terlouw;
- 1 Minister of Agriculture: Aat van Rhijn;
- 3 Ministers of Social Affairs: Dionysius Koolen, Aart Jan de Geus, Wouter Koolmees;
- 2 Minister of Health Aart Jan de Geus, Els Borst.

=== Foreign heads of state or government ===
- The Prime Minister of The United Kingdom of Great Britain and Northern Ireland: William Pitt, 1st Earl of Chatham;
- A signatory to the U.S. Constitution: Hugh Williamson;
- The South African Prime Minister: D. F. Malan;
- The Prime Minister of Suriname: Severinus Desiré Emanuels;
- A president of Suriname:Fred Ramdat Misier;
- 7th President of Burma: Maung Maung;
- The President of Guatemala: Bernardo Arévalo;

=== Others ===
- Wim Aantjes, politician
- Arend Jan Boekestijn, historian, politician
- Lulzim Basha, Mayor of Tirana, politician, former Albanian minister
- Sabina Frederic, Argentine Minister of Security
- Anne-Marie Mineur, Member of the European Parliament (MEP) for the Netherlands
- Charles Spencer, 3rd Earl of Sunderland, First Lord of the Treasury
- Hugh Williamson, politician

== Writers ==
- Saba Hamzah, poet and scholar
- Carla de Jonge, art historian and museum director
- Benjamin Moser, earned his M.A. and Ph.D. from Utrecht University received the Pulitzer Prize for Biography in 2020 for his biography of Susan Sontag, titled Sontag: Her Life and Work.
- Andrew Murray, a South African writer, teacher and Christian pastor
- J. Slauerhoff, poet; novelist; assistant at the university's clinic for Dermatology and Venereal Diseases 1929–1930
- Jan Jakob Lodewijk ten Kate, poet
- Roelof ten Napel, writer, poet, and essayist

== Other alumni ==
- Annemarie, Duchess of Parma, journalist, consultant, and member of the extended Dutch royal family
- Anna Maria van Schurman, classicist and painter
- Clarence Barlow, composer
- James Boswell, author, lawyer
- Joke Brandt, diplomat
- David Dalrymple, Lord Hailes, author, lawyer
- Jacob Emil van Hoogstraten, Director Department of Economic Affairs in colonial Indonesia
- Cecilia Medina, jurist, lawyer
- Willem Marcus van Weede, law

== Faculty ==
- Mario Alinei
- Cornelis Dirk Andriesse
- Frans Andriessen
- Barnita Bagchi
- Julia Bailey-Serres
- Mieke Bal
- Marc Baldus
- Johann Conrad Barchusen, first chemistry professor
- Nicolaas Beets
- Reinout Willem van Bemmelen
- Jan Hendrik van den Berg
- Jan Bergstra
- Frits Beukers
- Johannes Martin Bijvoet
- Friedrich Wilhelm von Bissing
- Fred van der Blij
- Pieter Boddaert
- Hans L. Bodlaender
- Els Borst
- Henk J. M. Bos
- Onno J. Boxma
- Rosi Braidotti
- Sjaak Brinkkemper
- Marcel Van den Broecke
- Hendrik Brugmans
- Martin van Bruinessen
- C. H. D. Buys Ballot
- Heinrich von Cocceji
- Floris Cohen
- Wim Cohen
- Jacqueline Cramer
- Dirk van Dalen
- Gerrit De Geest
- Cees Dekker
- Dennis Dieks
- Isbrand van Diemerbroeck
- Jurriaan ten Doesschate
- Franciscus Donders
- Hans Duistermaat
- Carl Andreas Duker
- Thomas von der Dunk
- Cornelis van Eck
- Peter Ester
- Hans Freudenthal
- Bas de Gaay Fortman
- Robert van Genechten
- Beatrice de Graaf, a Dutch history professor at the Faculty of Humanities at Utrecht University, Stevin Prize laureate
- Johann Georg Graevius
- Diederick E. Grobbee an Epidemiologist and Distinguished University Professor
- Louis Grondijs
- Hendrik Jacob Hamaker
- A. G. van Hamel
- Sadik Harchaoui
- Pieter Harting
- Majid Hassanizadeh
- Michiel Hazewinkel
- William S. Heckscher
- Karl Heilbronner
- Philip Willem van Heusde
- Jacob van der Hoeden
- Martin Hoek
- Jan Hogendijk
- Paulien Hogeweg
- Jacoba Hol
- Johannes Hoornbeek
- Pieter Willem van der Horst
- Ambrosius Hubrecht
- Johannes Alphonsus Huisman
- G.P. van Itterzon
- Cornelis de Jager
- Mark Janse
- Hans Jansen
- Nico van Kampen
- Paul Joan George Kapteyn
- Gustav Heinrich Ralph von Koenigswald
- Ilse Kokula
- Jan Koster
- Jan Lambooy
- Jan van Leeuwen
- Jan Christiaan Lindeman
- Rob Meens, medieval historian
- Lambert Meertens
- Annette Merz
- Marcel Minnaert
- Bert Mosselmans
- Pieter van Musschenbroek
- Cornelis Willem Opzoomer
- Leonard Ornstein
- Jim van Os, a Dutch academic and Professor of Psychiatry of the Brain Center at Utrecht University Medical Center
- Ab Osterhaus
- Jean Abraham Chrétien Oudemans
- Mark Overmars, computer scientist
- Jean Henri Pareau
- Adriaan Theodoor Peperzak
- Petrus van Mastricht
- Herman Philipse
- Pieter Hendrik van Cittert
- Cornelis Pijnacker Hordijk
- Ronald Plasterk
- Sacha Prechal
- August Adriaan Pulle
- Jan de Quay
- Henricus Regius
- Henricus Reneri
- Maarten van Rossem
- Job de Ruiter
- Leopold Ružička
- Heleen Sancisi Weerdenburg
- Willem Saris
- Mirko Tobias Schäfer
- Hans Schenk
- Paul Schnabel
- Peter Schrijver
- Wisse Alfred Pierre Smit
- Hermann Snellen
- Sami Solanki
- T. A. Springer
- Hendricus Stoof
- Dirk Jan Struik
- Karel van der Toorn
- Uğur Ümit Üngör
- William Uricchio
- Peter van der Veer
- Jan G.F. Veldhuis
- Co Verdaas
- Pieter verLoren van Themaat
- Willem Anton van Vloten
- Johannes Voet
- Gisbertus Voetius
- Henk van der Vorst
- Petrus Johannes Waardenburg
- Willem Albert Wagenaar
- Stefan E. Warschawski
- C. E. A. Wichmann
- David de Wied
- Bernard de Wit
- Hermann Witsius
- George Weijer

=== Spinoza Prize laureates ===
- Anna Akhmanova is a Russian-born professor of Cell Biology,
- Bas van Bavel is a Dutch historian,
- René Bernards is a Dutch cancer researcher,
- Jozien Bensing is a Dutch clinical psychologist,
- Hans Clevers is a Dutch molecular geneticist, cell biologist and stem cell researcher,
- José van Dijck is a new media author and a distinguished university professor in media and digital society
- Robbert Dijkgraaf is a Dutch theoretical physicist, mathematician and string theorist,
- Naomi Ellemers is a distinguished professor of social psychology,
- Daan Frenkel is a Dutch computational physicist,
- Piet Gros is a Dutch chemist and professor biomacromolecular crystallography,
- Jan van Hooff a Dutch biologist best known for his research involving primates
- Albert J. R. Heck is a Dutch scientist and professor in the field of mass spectrometry and proteomics,
- Birgit Meyer is a German professor of religious studies,
- Ieke Moerdijk is a Dutch mathematician,
- Gerardus Johannes Mulder a Dutch organic and analytical chemist
- Hans Oerlemans is a Dutch climatologist specialized in glaciology and sea level,
- Frits van Oostrom is a university professor for the Humanities,
- Ben Scheres is a Dutch developmental biologist,
- Anne Barbara Underhill a Canadian astrophysicist
- Bert Weckhuysen is a professor of inorganic chemistry and catalysis,
- Jan Luiten van Zanden is a Dutch economic historian and professor of Global Economic History,

== Rectors ==
(Dates as rectors)

- Jan Ackersdijck 1840 to 1841
- Antonius Aemilius 1644 to 1645, and 1659 to 1660
- Christian Bernhard Albinus 1728 to 1729, and 1741 to 1742
- Hieronymus Simons van Alphen 1717 to 1718, and 1733 to 1734
- Henricus Johannes Arntzenius 1793 to 1794
- Hermann Arntzenius 1803 to 1804, and 1820 to 1821
- Johan d’Aulnis de Bourouill 1888 to 1889
- Johannes Marinus Simon Baljon 1904 to 1905
- Nicolaas Beets 1877 to 1878
- Daniel Berckringer 1648 to 1649
- Cornelis Adriaan Bergsma 1843 to 1844
- Jan Bleuland 1799 to 1800, and 1816 to 1817
- Hendrik Bolkestein 1934 to 1935
- Peter Bondam 1776 to 1777, and 1788 to 1789
- Gisbert Bonnet 1764 to 1765, 1779 to 1780, and 1792 to 1793
- Hermannus Bouman 1829 to 1830, and 1844-1845
- Willem Gerard Brill 1871 to 1872
- Arnoldus Johannes Petrus van den Broek 1923 to 1924
- William Laurence Brown 1789 to 1790
- Jan Richard de Brueys 1825 to 1826
- Johannes de Bruin 1663 to 1664, and 1672 to 1674
- Frans Burman (theologian, born 1628) 1664 to 1665, and 1670 to 1671
- Frans Burman (theologian, born 1671) 1718 to 1719
- Frans Burman (theologian, born 1708) 1746 to 1747, 1766 to 1767, and 1782 to 1783
- Pieter Burman the Elder 1703 to 1704, and 1711 to 1712
- Christophorus Henricus Didericus Buys Ballot 1863 to 1864
- Giovanni Salvemini (Johann Castillon) 1758 to 1759
- Ernst Julius Cohen 1915 to 1916
- Jacob Cramer (theologian) 1892 to 1893
- Hendrik Cornelis Dibbits 1894 to 1895
- Bernardus Schotanus 1635 to 1641
