= Van Vloten =

Van Vloten may refer to:

- Van Vloten (family), a Dutch patrician family

== People ==
- Anton August van Vloten (1864-1920), Dutch businessman and politician
- Gerlof van Vloten (1866-1903), Dutch writer and translator, editor of the 1895 edition of the Arabic encyclopedia Mafātīḥ al-ʿulūm
- Prof. Dr. Willem Anton van Vloten (born 1941), Dutch dermatologist
