= Bouix (surname) =

Bouix is a French surname. Notable people with the surname include:

- Évelyne Bouix (born 1953), French actress
- Marie Dominique Bouix (1808–1870), French Jesuit canon lawyer
