= Jan Christiaan Lindeman =

Dutch botanist (1921–2007)

- Born: 26 June 1921; Zutphen, Netherlands
- Died: 2007; Zeist, Netherlands

Jan Christiaan Lindeman (1921–2007) was a Dutch botanist who specialized in the flora of Suriname.

Lindeman was born on 26 June 1921 in Zutphen, Netherlands. He studied biology at Utrecht University, where he received his doctorate in 1953. As a botanist, he was a member of the 1948-1949 Suriname Expedition, and returned there from March 1953 to March 1955.

Lindeman worked in the Brazilian state of Paraná for years. He also worked as a scientific researcher at the herbarium of Utrecht University.

== Selected works ==
- Lindeman, Jan Christiaan (1953). The Vegetation of the Coastal Region of Suriname. Results of the scientific expedition to Suriname 1948—49 botanical series No. 1 (PDF). Drukkerij en Uitg.-Mij. v/h Kemink – via Naturalis Biodiversity Center.
- Bomenboek voor Suriname. Dienst 'Lands Bosbeheer Suriname. (together with A.M.W.Mennega) 1963
- Topographic Index for Surinam. Flora of the Guianas Newsletter 6: 1-52. 1990

== See also ==
- List of Utrecht University people
