= Van Hecke =

Van Hecke is a Dutch toponymic surname common in East Flanders, meaning "from (the) fence". Among variant forms are Van den Hecken, van Heck, van Hek and Vanhecke. Notable people with the surname include:

- Abraham van den Hecken (c.1615–c.1655), Dutch painter
- Jan Paul van Hecke (born 2000), Dutch footballer (Notably, His surname is styled as ‘Van Hecke’, as opposed to just ‘Hecke’)
- Andy Van Hekken (born 1979), American baseball pitcher
- Françoise Vanhecke (born 1957), Belgian soprano and music educator
- Frank Vanhecke (born 1959), Belgian politician
- Johan Van Hecke (born 1954), Belgian politician and MEP
- Lin Van Hek (also "Lynnette van Hecke"; born 1944), Australian writer and painter.
- Lise Van Hecke (born 1992), Belgian female volleyball player
- Preben Van Hecke (born 1982), Belgian cyclist
- Stefaan Van Hecke (born 1973), Belgian Green Party politician

== See also ==
- Van Eck
