= Marie Dominique Bouix =

Marie Dominique Bouix (b. 15 May 1808, at Bagnères-de-Bigorre, in the diocese of Tarbes; d. at Montech, France, 26 December 1870) was a French Jesuit canon lawyer.

His life was a long battle with Gallicanism. He has been called the restorer of canon law in France.

== Life ==
In 1825, on the completion of his college course in an institution of his native town, Bouix entered the Society of Jesus at Avignon, with his brother Marcel, and later taught the classics and occupied chairs of philosophy and theology in houses of the order. In 1842, when he was on the eve of his solemn profession, the precarious condition of his health rendered a continuance of the religious life impossible, and he obtained permission to retire from the society. This necessary withdrawal was a great disappointment to Bouix, who to the end of his life maintained the most cordial relations with his former brethren in religion, and received from them many evidences of a reciprocal regard.

Jan Roothan, General of the Jesuits, created him Doctor of Theology in 1851, in virtue of a power delegated by the Holy See to Jesuit generals; and Bouix's work, Du Concile Provincial, published in 1850 was dedicated to members of the order with whom he had previously been associated in scholastic work. The first two years of his life as a secular priest were spent in a curacy at the church of Saint Vincent de Paul, in Paris. Here he interested himself especially in the soldiers garrisoned at the capital, and founded in their behalf the society of Saint Maurice, which later spread throughout France.

In 1847 he was named to a chaplaincy, and became editor of the Voix de la Verité, to which he had already been a frequent contributor. He now became a prominent figure in the political and ecclesiastical life of Paris and was a member of the educational commission with Montalembert and Pierre-Louis Parisis. General Cavaignac, who aspired to the presidency of the republic, thought it wise to endeavour to enlist the sympathies of Bouix.

It was at this time, in 1848, that his first book appeared, combating an organization known as the Oeuvre de la Miséricorde. In 1849 he gave up everything for a time to minister to the victims of the cholera, which was then epidemic in Paris.

Raffaele Fornari, the papal nuncio at Paris, desiring to further the restoration of provincial councils, held a conference with Bouix and the Bollandist Van Hecke, at which it was decided that the best means of influencing public opinion aright would be the preparation of a book explaining the law of the Church on provincial councils. Bouix was charged with this work, and first published in the Univers four articles, preparing the public for the complete treatise, Du Concile Provincial, which appeared in 1850. A fifth article in the Univers, simply reaffirming the canon law on synods and combating therefore, in the judgment of some, the tendencies of Gallicanism, was followed immediately by the loss of his chaplaincy.

This event determined him to devote his life to dispelling the prejudices and errors which he believed had largely infected the clergy of France in regard to matters of law and discipline. To equip himself for this work he turned his steps towards Rome, where, with no other means of support than his daily Mass stipend, he passed the next four years (1851-55) in study and in the preparation of the several works on canonical topics. In 1854, the degree of Doctor of Both Laws was conferred upon him by order of Pope Pius IX. Returning to Paris in 1855, he continued his studies, and added to the series of treatises which established his fame as a canonist.

He founded at Arras, in 1860, the Revue des sciences ecclésiastiques, of which he was for one year the editor. In 1864, just as his anti-Gallican opinions were about to subject him to new rigours at the hands of Georges Darboy, Bouix was named Vicar-General of the Diocese of Versailles. The next year, when the royal exequatur came up for discussion in the French Senate, and Darboy advocated there the Gallican view, Bouix answered with a publication which contested the correctness of the archbishop's contentions.

He continued to write until 1870. Then, when really too weak to undertake a long journey, he went to the First Vatican Council as theologian of the Bishop of Montauban. Back in France he endeavoured to complete a work on the church, which he had already planned. It was while engaged on this work that death overtook him at Montech, in a religious house of which his sister was superior.

== Works ==
Besides many articles, contributed to newspapers and reviews, especially to the Revue des sciences ecclésiastiques, he wrote:

- Du concile provincial (published also in Latin translation, De Concilio Provinciali);
- Tractatus de Principiis Juris Canonici
- Tractatus de Capitulis
- Tractatus de Jure Liturgico
- Tractatus de Judiciis Ecclesiasticis, 2 vols
- Tractatus de Parocho
- Tractatus de Jure Regularium, 2 vols. (An abridged translation appeared in German)
- Tractatus de Episcopo, 2 vols
- Tractatus de Curiâ Romanâ
- Tractatus de Papa, 3 vols
- La verité sur l'assemblée de 1682
- Le prétendu droit d'exequatur
- La vérite sur la faculté de théologie de Paris, de 1663 à 1682
- L'Oeuvre de la miséricorde
- Méditations pour tous les jours de l'année, 4 vols
- Le solitaire des rochers
- Histoire des vingt-six martyrs de Japon, 2 vols.

Several of his works were honoured with pontifical letters of commendation, and most of his canonical treatises went through several editions.
