= Jansje Gretha Schuiringa =

Dutch dentist

Jansje Gretha (Jans) Schuiringa
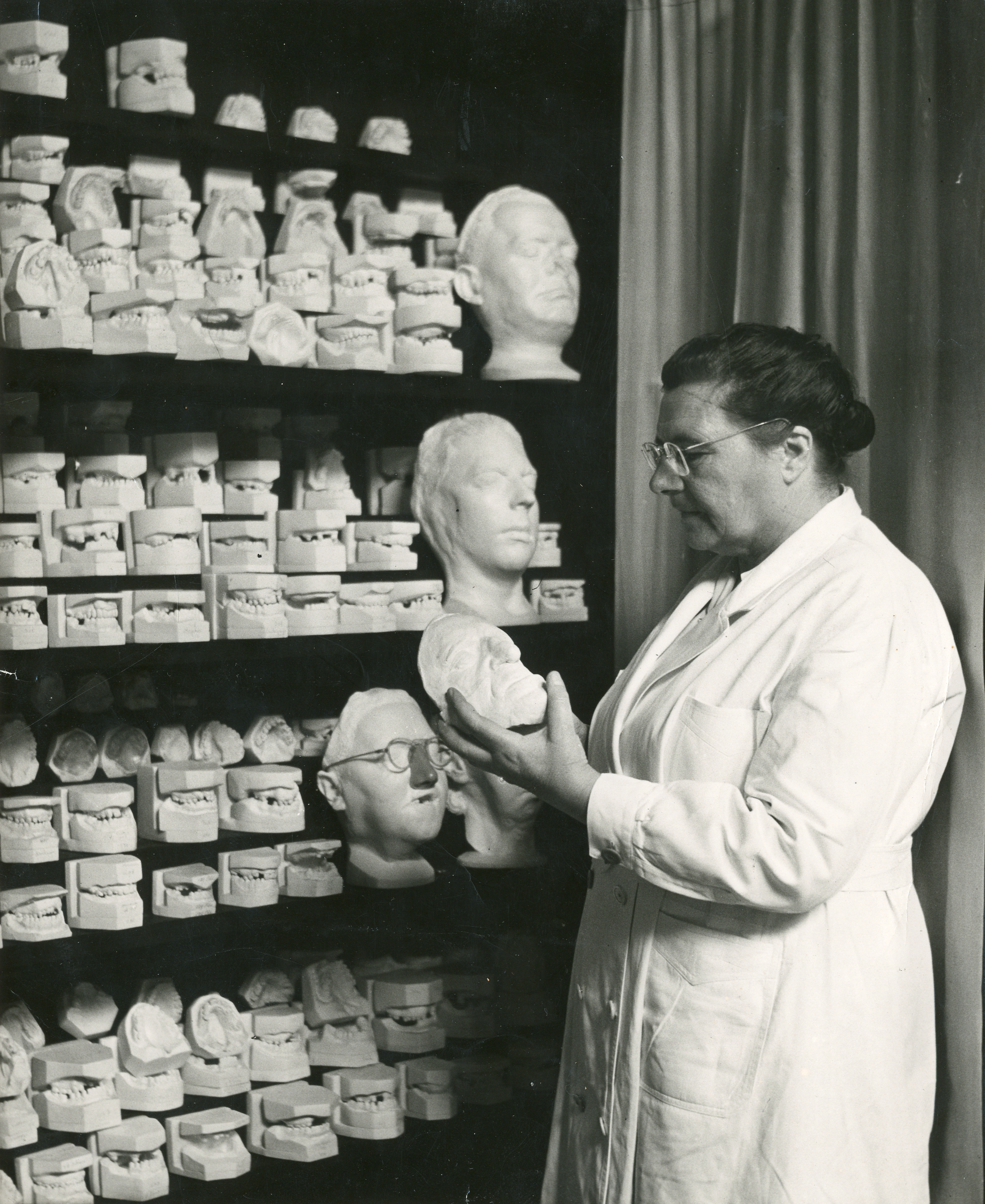
- Jans Schuiringa
- Born: 9 July 1887; Balmahuizen
- Died: 1 August 1975 (aged 88); Utrecht
- Scientific career
- Fields: Dentist, Professor

Jansje Gretha (Jans) Schuiringa (Balmahuizen, 9 July 1887 - Utrecht, 1 August 1975), also known as Miss Schuiringa, was one of the first people in the Netherlands to hold the title of dentist. The work that Schuiringa carried out between 1920 and 1957 as a professor of prosthetic dentistry at the Institute of Dentistry in Utrecht, was of major significance in the development of the discipline of maxillofacial dental surgery. Maxillofacial dental surgery, which operates on the jaw and the face, involves making prosthetics for the face and teeth.

== Youth ==
Schuiringa grew up in an affluent farm family in the Groningen hamlet of Balmahuizen. Her father, Jan Jacob Schuiringa, and mother, Anja Huizing, had nine children, of which two were stillborn. Jans was the eldest of the seven surviving children.

Schuiringa went to elementary school in the nearby village of Niehove. Her father requested permission for Jans to be enrolled in Higher Civic School. The request was granted and Jans received her secondary education at the Rijks Hogere Burgerschool (National Civic High School) on the Kamerlingheplein in Groningen.

== Dental Training ==
After completing high school, Schuiringa began training privately with a dentist in Groningen. On 13 May 1909 she passed her theoretical exam in dentistry. She received subsequent training in dentistry at Utrecht University. In 1913, while in Utrecht, Schuiringa became a member of the Utrecht Women's Student Association (U.V.S.V.). She received her diploma of dentistry on 27 June 1913, not long after the title for the discipline was changed by royal decree from 'tooth doctor' (tandmeester) to 'dentist'. She was thus among the first to bear this title. In the same year, she was appointed as the technical assistant of I.J.E. de Vries, a professor in the prosthetics department of the Institute of Dentistry in Utrecht. Between 1914 and 1918, Schuiringa was also an assistant to the lecture of orthodontics, J.A.W. van Loon.

While reading professional literature about damage to the jaw and face during the First World War, Schuiringa became interested in the treatment of patients with a combination of surgical and prosthetic methods. At the time, this form of treatment was still in its infancy in the Netherlands. Schuiringa gained practical experience at De Vrie's clinic in Amsterdam with the treatment of wounded jaws. In 1916, she opened her own dental practice.

In 1918, Schuiringa took over clinical instruction from De Vries until a new lecturer was appointed. On 26 August 1920 Schuiringa herself was appointed as the new professor of prosthetic dentistry; she was thirty-three years old. A few months later, on 3 February 1921, she delivered an inaugural public lecture.

== Professorship and Private Practice ==
As a professor, Schuiringa was supposed to give up her dental practice in order to devote herself entirely to the education of dentists-in-training. However, she continued to see patients with deformities of the jaw and face in her private practice as there were no other treatment options for these patients at the Institute of Dentistry. Schuiringa's patients had frequently suffered from injuries due to accidents, cancer, or from birth defects such as cleft lips and palates. Schuiringa often worked with these patients until the end of their treatments, teaching them to eat, speak and swallow again with the assistance of their prothesis.

In the years prior to the Second World War, many wealthy patients travelled to cities such as Paris, Berlin, and Vienna for surgical-prosthetic treatment. In that era, surgeons outside the Netherlands were more advanced in the technique of this combined treatment. Patients with less means were treated by dentists such as Schuiringa. In her private clinic, she helped prosthetic patients who could not be helped at the university clinics. Schuiringa's efforts on behalf of indigent patients did not remain unnoticed.

== Royal Distinction and Retirement from the University ==
Order of Orange-Nassau ribbon - Officer

On 7 July 1947 Schuiringa was named an officer in the Order of Orange-Nassau, in recognition for her thirty-year commitment to dental education and to dentistry.

Ten years later, on 26 June 1957, she retired from the Institute of Dentistry at age 69. From November 1945 to June 1948, she had also been the acting director of the institute.

== Private life ==
Apart from her activities in the field of dentistry, Schuiringa was also active in social organizations. She was a member of the Association of Women with Higher Education (VVAO) and, between 1924 and 1932, she served on the board of directors of the organization. In 1929, she founded the Utrecht chapter of Soroptimist International. As a hobby, she cared for birds in her own aviary.

Schuiringa died on 1 August 1971 in Utrecht. She was buried in Niehove, the village where she attended elementary school. In her obituary, Schuiringa's life was described as "an altruistic, active and tumultuous life, dedicated to dental education and to handicapped people".

== Publications ==
- Enkele belangrijke factoren uit de ontwikkelingsgeschiedenis der prothetische tandheelkunde (Utrecht 1921).
- 'Eene bevestigingsmethode voor obturatoren bij kinderen met melkgebit of wisselgebit', in: Tijdschrift voor tandheelkunde volume 30 (1923), 452–461.
- 'A new system of fixation of obturators', in: Journal of the American Dental Association volume 15 (1928), 412–422.
- 'Toelichting bij de grondbeginselen der chirurgisch-prothetische tandheelkunde ten dienste van de voorbehandeling van hoofdverwondingen', in: Tijdschrift voor tandheelkunde volume 46 (1939), 991–1016.
- 'De tandheelkunde tijdens en na den oorlog in Nederland', in: Die offisiële tydskrif van die Tandheelkundige Vereniging van Suid-Afrika jaargang 2 (1947), 68–72.
- Le rôle de la prothèse restauratrice dans la réadaptation sociale et professionnelle des blessés de la face (lecture delivered in Knokke, ca. 1948).
- 'Expériences de traitements chirurgicaux prothétiques de la mâchoire inférieure', in: Journal dentaire belge volume 41 (1950), 115–122.
- Naar de erkenning: gevarieerde bijzonderheden uit een halve eeuw ontwikkeling in oorlogs- en vredestijd van de tandheelkundige chirurgische prothetiek temidden van het groeiende tandheelkundige onderwijs aan de Rijksuniversiteit te Utrecht (Utrecht: J.G. Schuiringafonds 1976).

== Legacy ==
During the fortieth anniversary celebration of dentistry in the Netherlands, a charitable fund was established in Schuringa's name: the J. G. Schuiringa Fund. In its first years, money from the fund was used to support indigent patients who needed to undergo surgical-prosthetic procedures. After Schuiringa's death, the fund was directed to the advancement of scientific work and to advanced study in the field of dentistry. The J.G. Schuiringa Fund awards an annual prize in collaboration with the Dutch Association for Gnathology and Prosthetic Dentistry (NVGPT). This prize serves to encourage scholarly work in the field of dental-surgical practical. In 2015, the prize was awarded to Dr. Anke Korfage of the University of Groningen.

The collection of Schuiringa's work materials numbers approximately twelve hundred models, among which are many impressions and photographs of jaws. The Utrecht University Museum has curated these materials since 1963. A few of the prosthetics Schuiringa made are on exhibit at the museum.
