= Van Eck =

Van Eck is a Dutch toponymic surname. The name can be derived from Van Heck ("from fence") or van eik (wood from oak), but perhaps most families, including the noble family (Van Panthaleon) Van Eck, find their origin in the town Eck in Gelderland, first mentioned in the year 953. People with this surname include:

- Caroline van Eck (born 1959), Dutch art historian and academic
- Cornelis van Eck (1662–1732), Dutch jurist and poet
- Jos van Eck (born 1964), Dutch footballer
- Lubbert Jan van Eck (1719–1765), Dutch Baron and governor of Ceylon
- Pierre Vaneck (1931–2010), French actor of Belgian origin
- René van Eck (born 1966), Dutch footballer
