= Jan K. Buitelaar =

Dutch doctor, author and academic

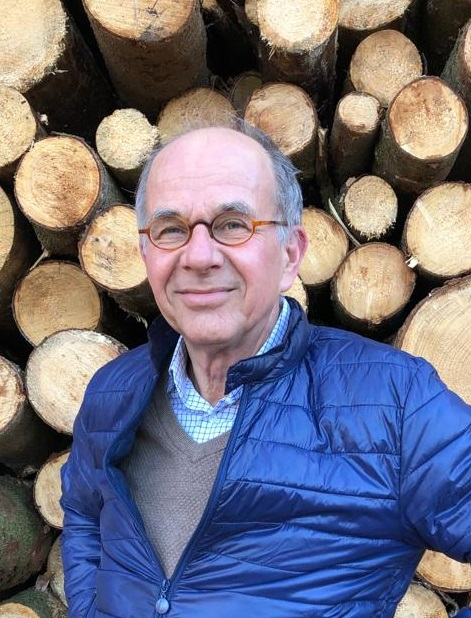
- Occupations: Medical doctor, psychiatrist, author, academic

Academic background
- Education: BS in Medicine; BS in Philosophy; M.D. Ph.D.
- Alma mater: Utrecht University
- Thesis: (1991)

Jan K. Buitelaar is a Dutch medical doctor, psychiatrist, author, and academic. He is a professor of psychiatry and child and adolescent psychiatry at Radboud University Medical Centre and former Head of Child and Adolescent Psychiatry at Karakter Child and Adolescent Psychiatry.

Buitelaar's research interests span the fields of neuropsychiatry and developmental disorders, with a particular focus on autism and Attention deficit hyperactivity disorder (ADHD). He has led research projects focusing on ADHD, autism, aggressive behavior, and emotional problems in children, adolescents, and adults. He has authored three books aimed at a broader audience including Het is ADHD, Dit is ADHD, and Handboek ADHD en comorbide stoornissen. Additionally, he has written several book chapters and published over 1200 articles.

Buitelaar is a Fellow of the International Society for Autism Research, vice-president of the World Federation of ADHD, member and treasurer of the Steering Committee of Eunethydis, and a member of the European ADHD Guidelines Group. He has served as a Co-Editor and Chief Editor of European Child and Adolescent Psychiatry.

== Education ==
Buitelaar obtained his bachelor's degree in Medicine in 1974 and pursued a second bachelor's degree in Philosophy in 1975. He then completed his M.D. in Medicine in 1978, followed by a psychiatry residency at Utrecht University in 1983 and later at Erasmus University in 1985. In 1991, he received his Ph.D. in psychiatry from Utrecht University.

== Career ==
Following his Ph.D., Buitelaar began his academic career as an assistant professor of Child Psychology in 1991 at the University of Utrecht and was promoted to professor in 1995. Since 2002, he has held the position of professor at Radboud University.

Buitelaar has also been appointed as the Clinical Director of Child Psychiatry Services at the Department of Child and Adolescent Psychiatry at the University Medical Centre Utrecht, Head of the Department of Psychiatry at Radboud University, and the Head of Karakter Child and Adolescent Psychiatry University Centre in Nijmegen. Moreover, he serves as a principal investigator at Radboud University Medical Center and the Donders Institute for Brain, Cognition and Behavior.

Buitelaar was a child and adolescent psychiatrist at the Community Mental Health Center from 1985 to 1991 and the chair of the Dutch Knowledge Centre for Child and Adolescent Psychiatry from 2013 to 2020.

== Research ==
Buitelaar's research has been focused on neurocognitive, molecular genetic, neuroimaging, and imaging genetics studies in autism spectrum disorders, ADHD, and other developmental disorders. He has received media coverage for his research work.

=== Early screening of autism in the general population ===
Buitelaar initiated the study to screen autism traits in the general population and performed a large experiment. In collaboration with his team, he screened 30,000 infants at age 14 months for early signs and symptoms of autism in the general population from 1998 to 2006. They developed and validated a screening tool named Early Screening of Autism Traits (ESAT, later renamed to CoSoS) which was then implemented in the healthcare system in the province of Utrecht. Additionally, ESAT is also implemented in the Van Wiechem system, a monitoring system at the well-baby offices in the Netherlands. The research elucidated that the phenotypic manifestations of ASD at age 14 are highly heterogeneous and somewhat generic, sharing similarities with other neurodevelopmental problems such as ADHD, mental handicap, and language delay.

=== Molecular-genetic studies in ADHD in the Netherlands ===
While working as a co-investigator on the NIH-funded IMAGE project in 2002, Buitelaar introduced molecular genetic studies in ADHD and related neurodevelopmental disorders in the Netherlands. Together with his colleague Barbara Franke, he developed genetic, cognitive, and neural studies into neurodevelopmental disorders.

=== Establishing the NeuroIMAGE cohort ===
Buitelaar served as the lead Principal Investigator and initiator of the largest DNA-Cognition-MRI study involving individuals with ADHD and controls, which was funded by the Netherlands Organisation for Scientific Research (NWO). His team assessed, and conducted MRI scans on 751 individuals from ADHD families and 318 individuals from control families. This study contributed to the understanding of the neurobiological basis of ADHD, particularly highlighting the substantial phenotypic and neurobiological heterogeneity within ADHD. It suggested that smaller-sized studies may overestimate case-control differences by not capturing the disorder's wide phenotypic and neurobiological variation. Furthermore, the findings indicated that neural responses to inhibition tasks, particularly neural connectivity patterns, distinguish individuals with ADHD from controls more effectively than behavioral data. They also noted age-dependent differences in basal ganglia volumes between those with ADHD and controls. Moreover, the severity of ADHD symptoms appears to be influenced by the interaction between the 5-HTTLPR gene and stress, with this gene-environment interaction mediated by gray matter in the prefrontal cortex.

=== Restrictive elimination diet ===
As the principal investigator of a Dutch study, Buitelaar examined the effects of a restrictive elimination diet on ADHD symptoms. He elucidated that a strictly supervised restricted elimination diet is a valuable instrument to assess whether ADHD is induced by food but that the prescription of diets on the basis of IgG blood tests should be discouraged.

=== Introducing Research and Clinical Care for Adults with ADHD in Europe ===
Together with Sandra Kooij, he found that ADHD in adults is a valid and distinct psychiatric disorder and highlighted the chances of improvement in sleep quality and nocturnal motor activity in adults with ADHD through stimulant treatment.

== Awards and honors ==
- 1994 – Rudolf Magnus Research Award, UMC Utrecht
- 2004 – Editor in Chief, European Child and Adolescent Psychiatry
- 2011 – Outstanding Research Performance Award, Dutch Society for Psychiatry
- 2017 – Vice-president, World Federation of ADHD
- 2018 – Fellow, International Society for Autism Research
- 2019 – Oeuvre Award, the European Society for Child and Adolescent Psychiatry
- 2020 – Knight in the Order of the Dutch Lion
- 2022 – Lifetime Achievement Award, the European Network of Hyperkinetic Disorders
- 2023 – Lifetime Achievement Award, International Society for Autism Research
- 2023 – Elected member of the Academia Europaea
- Ranked 3rd as the world's leading expert in ADHD
- Ranked 15th as the world's leading expert in autism
- Ranked 995 among the best medicine scientists worldwide
- Ranked 72 among the best psychology scientists worldwide

== Bibliography ==
=== Selected books ===
- Het is ADHD (2010) ISBN 978-9031345649
- Dit is ADHD (2014) ISBN 978-9401404280
- Handbook ADHD en comorbide stoornissen (2016) ISBN 978-9401421171

=== Selected articles ===
- Mulder, E. J., De Medina, P. R., Huizink, A. C., Van den Bergh, B. R., Buitelaar, J. K., & Visser, G. H. (2002). Prenatal maternal stress: effects on pregnancy and the (unborn) child. Early human development, 70(1–2), 3–14.
- Huizink, A. C., Robles de Medina, P. G., Mulder, E. J., Visser, G. H., & Buitelaar, J. K. (2003). Stress during pregnancy is associated with developmental outcome in infancy. Journal of Child Psychology and Psychiatry, 44(6), 810–818.
- Huizink, A. C., Mulder, E. J., de Medina, P. G. R., Visser, G. H., & Buitelaar, J. K. (2004). Is pregnancy anxiety a distinctive syndrome? Early human development, 79(2), 81–91.
- Taylor, E., Döpfner, M., Sergeant, J., Asherson, P., Banaschewski, T., Buitelaar, J., ... & Zuddas, A. (2004). European clinical guidelines for hyperkinetic disorder–first upgrade. European child & adolescent psychiatry, 13, i7-i30.
- Boonstra, A. M., Oosterlaan, J., Sergeant, J. A., & Buitelaar, J. K. (2005). Executive functioning in adult ADHD: a meta-analytic review. Psychological medicine, 35(8), 1097–1108.
- Nijmeijer, J. S., Minderaa, R. B., Buitelaar, J. K., Mulligan, A., Hartman, C. A., & Hoekstra, P. J. (2008). Attention-deficit/hyperactivity disorder and social dysfunctioning. Clinical psychology review, 28(4), 692–708.
- Cortese, S., Ferrin, M., Brandeis, D., Buitelaar, J., Daley, D., Dittmann, R. W., ... & European ADHD Guidelines Group. (2015). Cognitive training for attention-deficit/hyperactivity disorder: meta-analysis of clinical and neuropsychological outcomes from randomized controlled trials. Journal of the American Academy of Child & Adolescent Psychiatry, 54(3), 164–174.
- Franke, B., Michelini, G., Asherson, P., Banaschewski, T., Bilbow, A., Buitelaar, J. K., ... & Reif, A. (2018). Live fast, die young? A review on the developmental trajectories of ADHD across the lifespan. European Neuropsychopharmacology, 28(10), 1059–1088.
- Cortese, S., Asherson, P., Sonuga-Barke, E., Banaschewski, T., Brandeis, D., Buitelaar, J., ... & Simonoff, E. (2020). ADHD management during the COVID-19 pandemic: guidance from the European ADHD Guidelines Group. The Lancet Child & Adolescent Health, 4(6), 412–414.
