= Gerlof van Vloten =

Dutch orientalist, translator and writer (1866–1903)

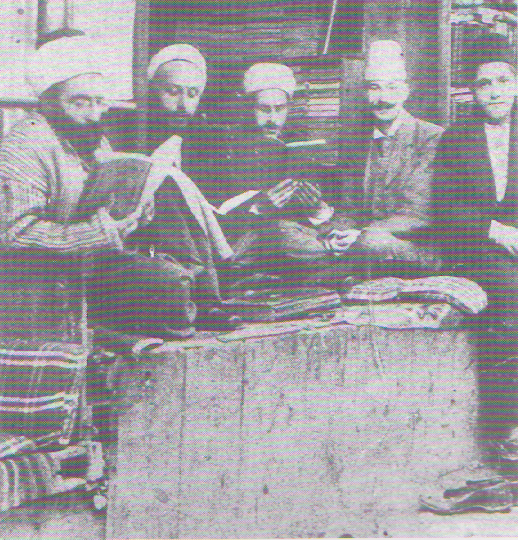
Gerlof van Vloten in Constantinople in 1896 (second to the left)

Gerlof van Vloten (1866–1903), was a Dutch orientalist, writer and translator. He was the editor of the 1895 edition of the Arabic encyclopedia Mafātīḥ al-ʿulūm.

== See also ==
- Van Vloten (family)
