= Saba Hamzah =

Yemeni poet and scholar

- Born: 1986 (age 39–40); Sanaa, North Yemen
- Education: University of Science and Technology; Utrecht University (MA)
- Children: 3

Saba Hamzah (Arabic: سبأ حمزة; born 1986) is a Yemeni poet and scholar. She has written two poetry collections. She is a co-founder of the Yemeni Women's Archive and a researcher for the Dutch National Museum of World Cultures. She left Yemen as part of the diaspora in 2016, eventually settling in the Netherlands where she earned a master's degree from Utrecht University in gender studies. She previously earned a degree at the University of Science and Technology in Sanaa.

== Early life, education and diaspora ==
Saba Hamzah was born in Sanaa, North Yemen, in 1986. She earned a BEd in English language and literature at the University of Science and Technology in 2008. She taught English and edited a magazine. She wrote the poetry collection Virgin Hymns, which was published in 2012 by Dar Alkotob AlYamania. It was the bestselling Yemeni book at the 2013 Riyadh International Book Fair.

Hamzah left Yemen with her three children in 2016 as part of the Yemeni diaspora. They first went to Egypt, then Turkey, before arriving in The Netherlands in 2018. She stayed in a Dutch refugee centre and by her third month had passed the integration language exams. She attended Utrecht University and earned her MA in gender studies in 2020. The Rosanna Fund for Women Fellowship of Utrecht University gave Hamzah an honourable mention in 2020.

== Writing and research ==
Hamzah is a researcher with the Dutch National Museum of World Cultures. She has contributed to research into cognitive and structural violence with the University of Helsinki. She joined with the gender studies department of Radboud University Nijmegen to contribute research on violence against people with special needs to a Dutch publication about healthy societies. Among her research papers is "Peacebuilding and Women's Integration". She has written for Al-Araby Al-Jadeed, Fanack, and the Sana'a Center for Strategic Studies. She has been a fellow scholar with Vassar College since 2022.

Hamzah published the poetry collection Our Shared Sky in 2021. The same year, her Dutch poetry was nominated for the El Hizjra Prize for Literature. She contributed to the poetry compilation Touches of Memory: Texts for Yemeni Voices, which was published in German in 2021. Hamzah is also a photographer and since 2015, she has worked on Landless: Our Shared Heaven a photo-poetry collection. She contributed a filmpoem, Soliloquy to Floating Doom, to the 2021 Liverpool Arab Arts Festival.

In early 2022, Hamzah founded the Yemeni Women Archive with Yemeni artist Jihad Jarallah. The initiative seeks to document women's experiences in Yemen and as part of the diaspora. The initiative's Mural of Shes project, for Yemeni women writers, received support from the Dutch Ministry of Foreign Affairs. She is a 2023 writer-in-residence for the International Writing Program of the University of Iowa.

== Personal life ==
Hamzah has three children, one of whom has special needs.

== Literary works ==
=== Poetry collections ===
- Virgin Hymns (تراتيل عذراء; 2012)
- Our Shared Sky (حصتنا من السماء; 2021)

=== Contributions ===
- Touches of Memory: Texts for Yemeni Voices (2021)
