= Van Vloten (family) =

Dutch patrician family from Vleuten

- family
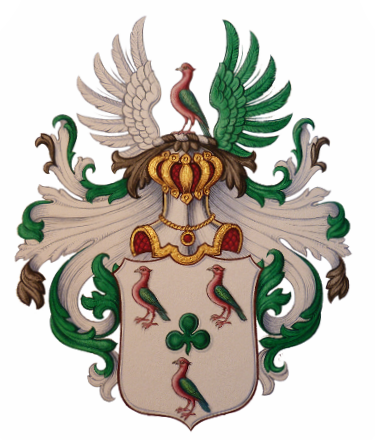
- Country: Netherlands
- Founded: 17th century
- Founder: Meindert Cornelisz. van der Haer

Van Vloten is a Dutch patrician family from Vleuten.

== History ==
The oldest known family member is one Meindert Cornelisz van der Haer (later van Vloten), who was a carpenter in Utrecht and died in 1666. The families with the surnames Van Bommel van Vloten, Van Braam van Vloten, Gaaikema van Vloten and Stael van Holstein van Vloten are branches of the Van Vloten family.

== Notable members ==
- Johannes van Vloten (1740–1809), Dutch theologician, father of:
  - Martha van Vloten (1857–1943), wife of Frederik van Eeden
  - Betsy van Vloten (1862–1946), wife of Willem Witsen
  - Gerlof van Vloten 1866–1903), Dutch writer and translator, editor of the Arabic encyclopedia Kitāb Mafātīḥ al-ʿulūm
  - Kitty van Vloten (1867–1945), wife of Albert Verwey
- Anton August van Vloten (1864–1920), Dutch businessman and politician
- Prof. Dr. Willem Anton van Vloten (1941–2025), Dutch dermatologist

== Family coat of arms ==
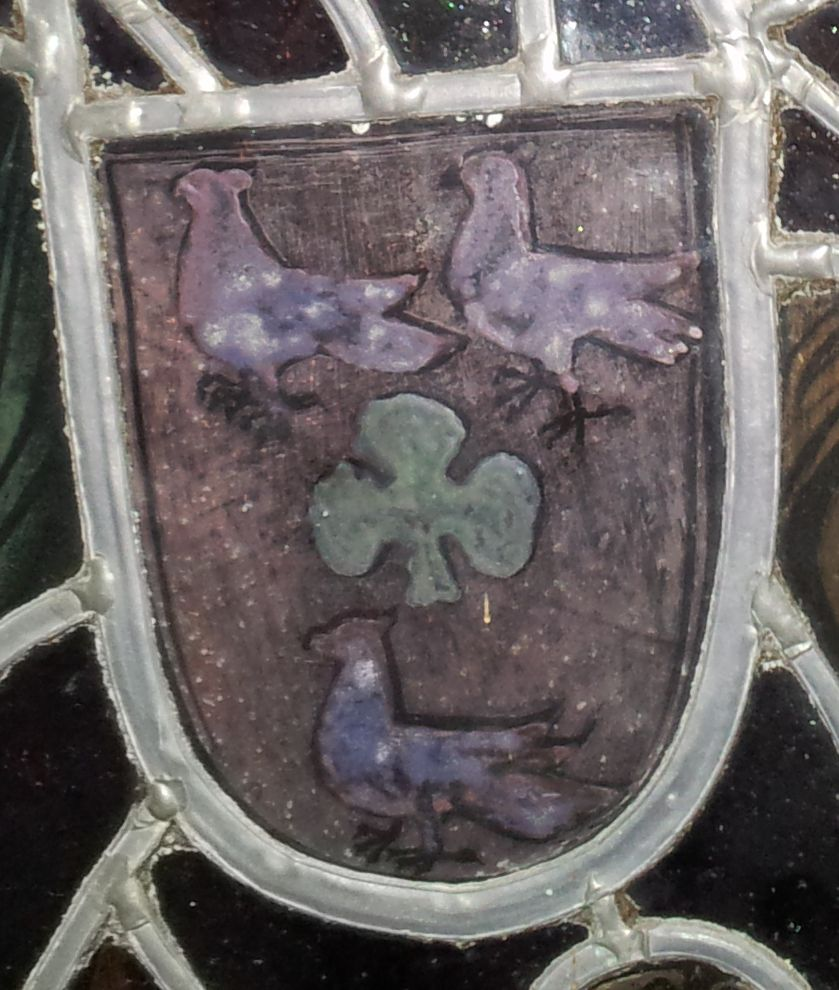
Family coat of arms in leadlight

The family coat of arms consists of a green cloverleaf in a silver field, accompanied by three doves of natural color.

== Literature ==
- (in Dutch) Nederland´s Patriciaat 5th edition. Centraal Bureau voor de Genealogie 1914
- (in Dutch) Nederland’s Patriciaat 88th edition. Centraal Bureau voor de Genealogie 2007/’08
- (in Dutch) Stokvis, Pieter.; Uuden, Cornelie van. De gezusters van Vloten. De vrouwen achter Frederik van Eeden, Willem Witsen en Albert Verwey. Uitgeverij Bert Bakker. Amsterdam 2007
