= Niehove =

- Village
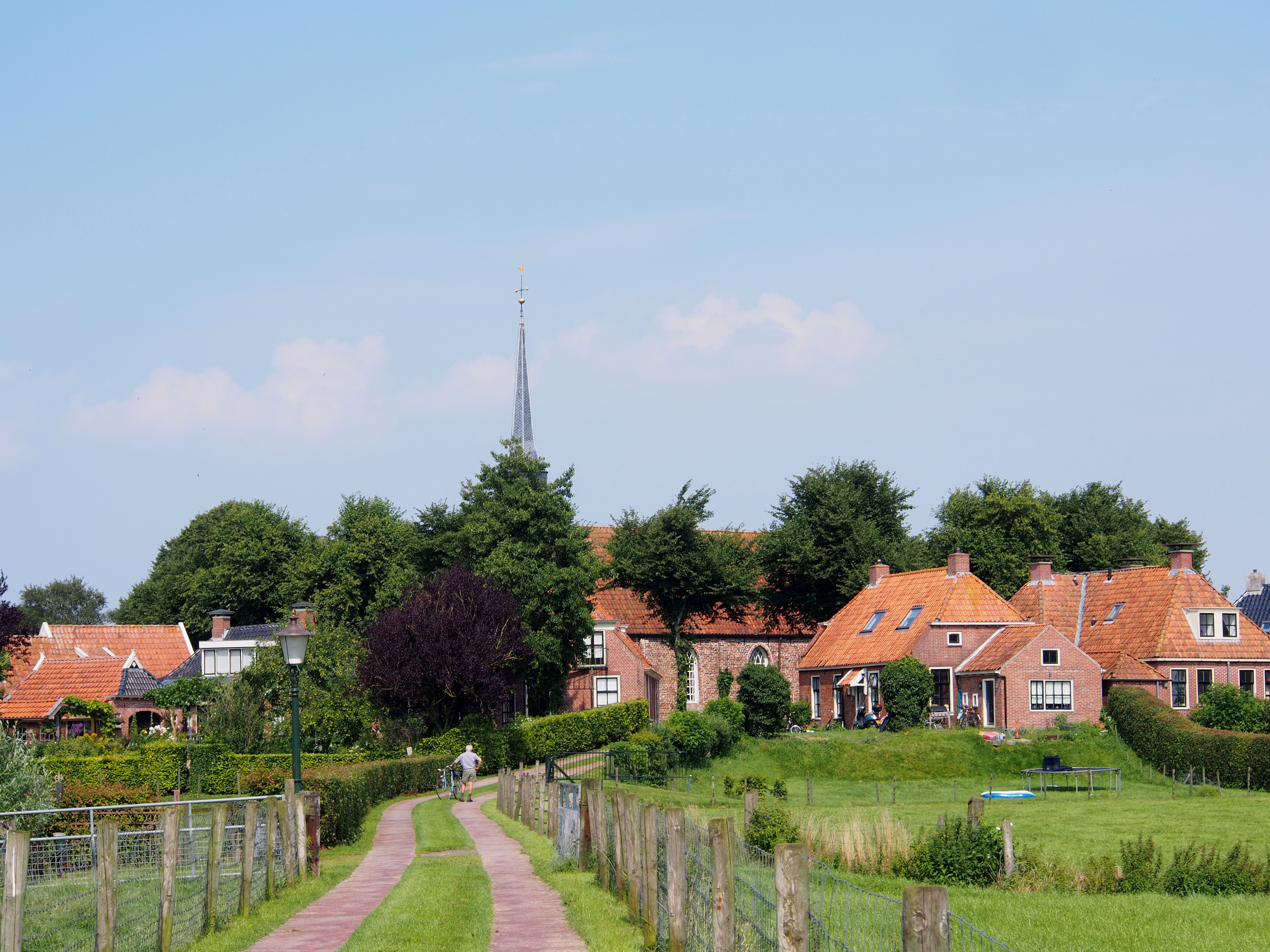
- View on Niehove

- Location in the province of Groningen in the Netherlands Niehove (Netherlands)
- Coordinates: 53.29002°N 6.36635°E
- Country: Netherlands
- Province: Groningen
- Municipality: Westerkwartier

Area
  - Total: 0.30 km^{2} (0.12 sq mi)
- Elevation: 1.6 m (5.2 ft)

Population (2021)
  - Total: 130
  - Density: 430/km^{2} (1,100/sq mi)
- Time zone: UTC+1 (CET)
  - Summer (DST): UTC+2 (CEST)
- Postal code: 9884
- Dialing code: 0594
- Website: niehove.eu

Niehove (old name: Suxwort) is a village in the municipality of Westerkwartier in Groningen, Netherlands. The village was located on the island of Humsterland in the former Lauwerszee from c. 800 until c. 1500. It is a terp (artificial living hill) village with two ring roads and the church in the middle. The village is a protected site. In 2019, Elsevier Weekblad named Niehove the most beautiful village of the Netherlands.

== History ==
Niehove has been permanently inhabited since at least the 2nd century BC. It used to be known as Suxwort. It is a terp (artificial living hill) village with a radial structure. The church is located in the middle at a height of 3.7 metres (12 ft). There are two ring roads around the terp, and the houses and farms were built along the roads. Paths run down the hill like spokes in a wheel.

Around 800, the Lauwerszee, a bay in the Wadden Sea, started to form and Suxwort found itself on a little island called Humsterland. Around 1200, the frequency of floods started to increase, and to protect the village a dike was built around the island. At the end of the 14th century, a provost and court house were established in the village. Around the same time, the village of Suxwort was renamed Niehove. Hummerze, the other village on the island, was renamed Oldehove. Around 1500, Cistercian monks from the Aduard Abbey started to build dikes and polder the land, and Suxwort returned to the mainland.

== Christianity ==
The early relation of Suxwort with Christianity was troublesome. In 754, Saint Boniface was killed near Dokkum by a mob of bandits from the east of the Lauwerszee which probably referred to the area around Suxwort. His successor Willehad arrived in Suxwort in 777 and had to flee for his life. Ludger, the next missionary, did manage to christen the village in 804, and the first wooden church was built. The current church was built around 1230 and has no transepts. It was extended in the 15th century, and the west wing was renewed in 1619.

== Recent history ==
Niehove was home to 310 people in 1840. In the late-19th century, a part of the terp was excavated. In 1991, the entire village of Niehove was designated a protected site. Niehove used to be part of the municipality of Oldehove. In 1990, it became part of Zuidhorn, and in 2019, it became part of Westerkwartier.

== Gallery ==
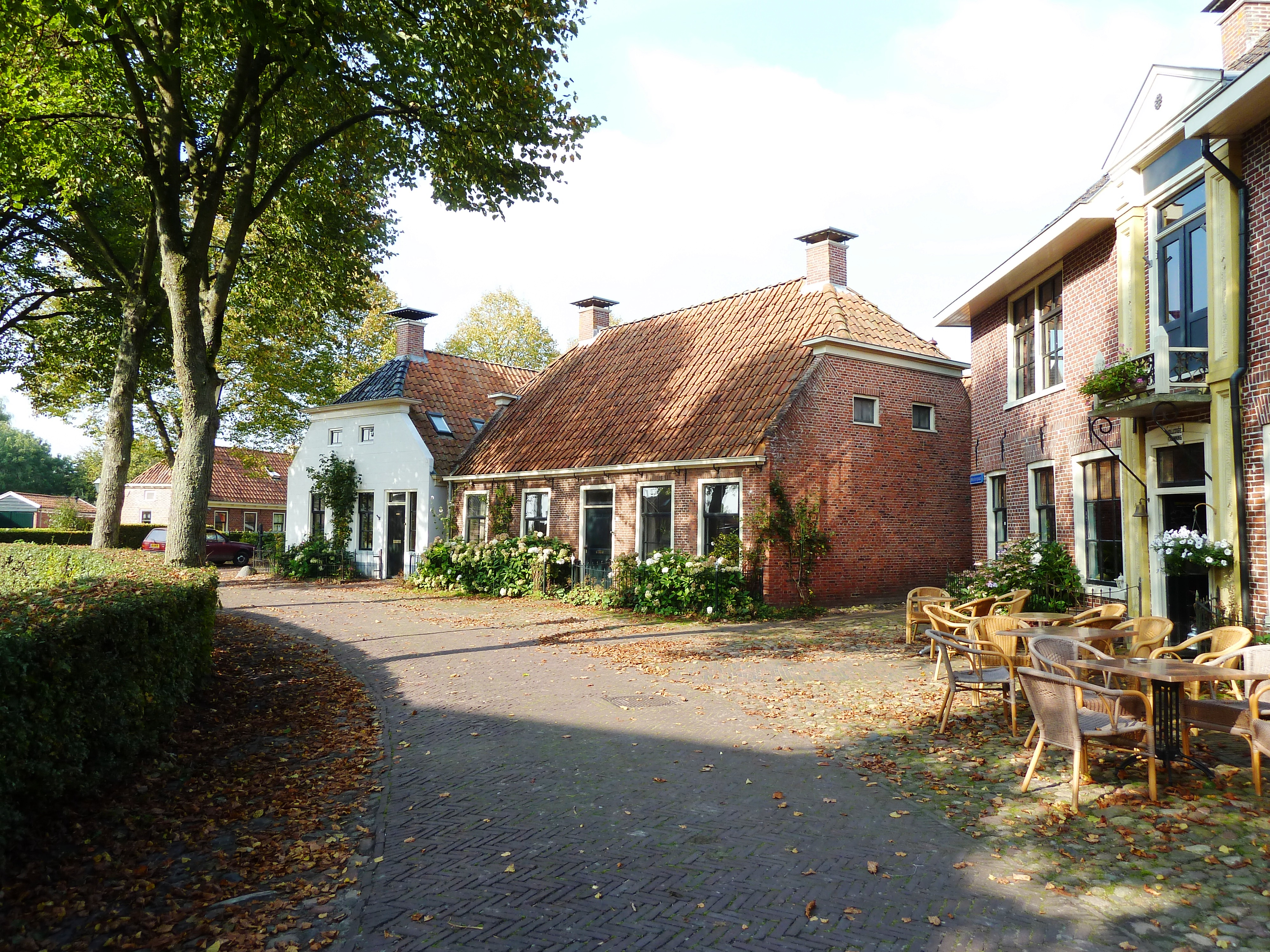
View of the terp ringroad

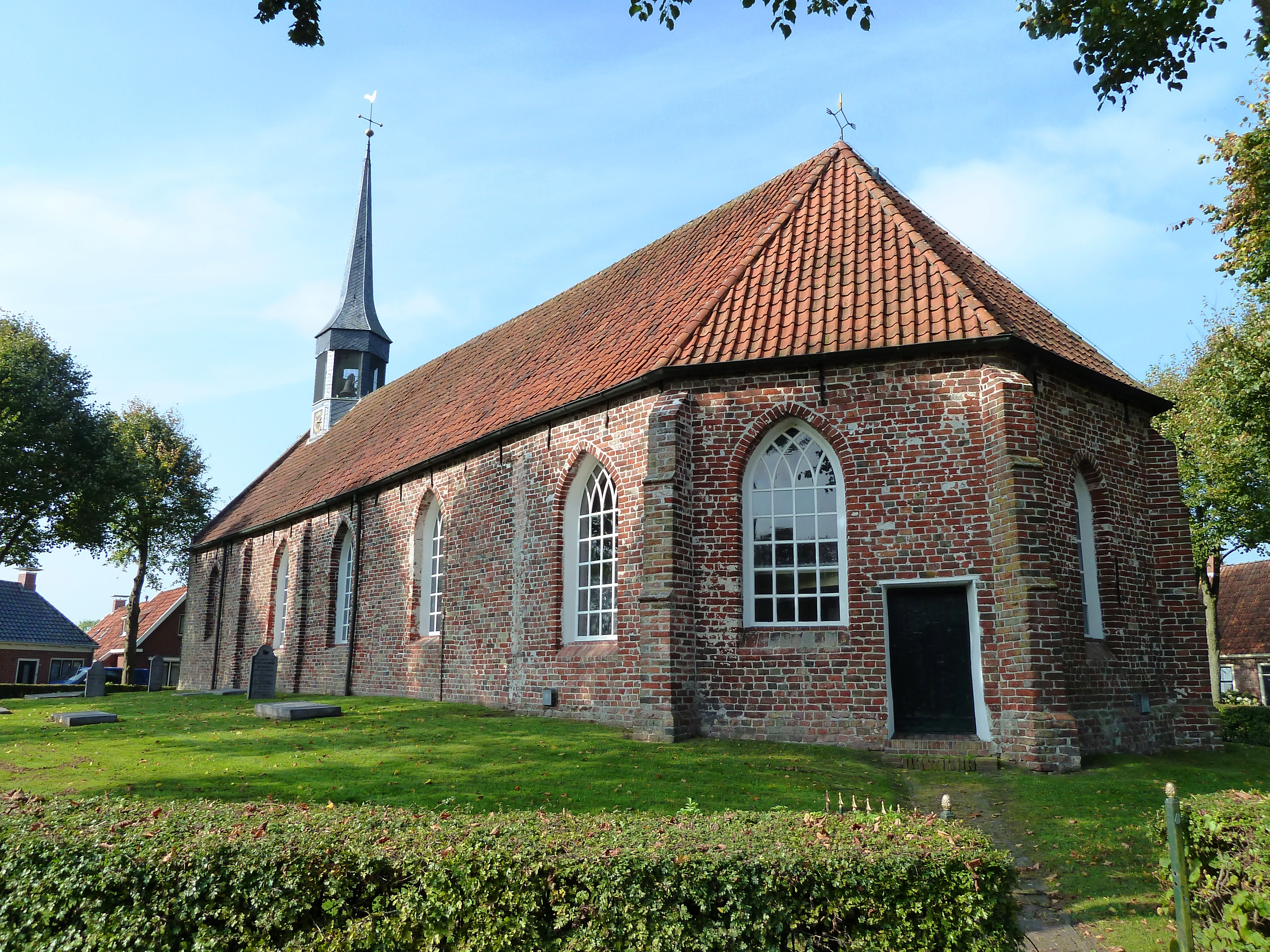
Church of Niehove

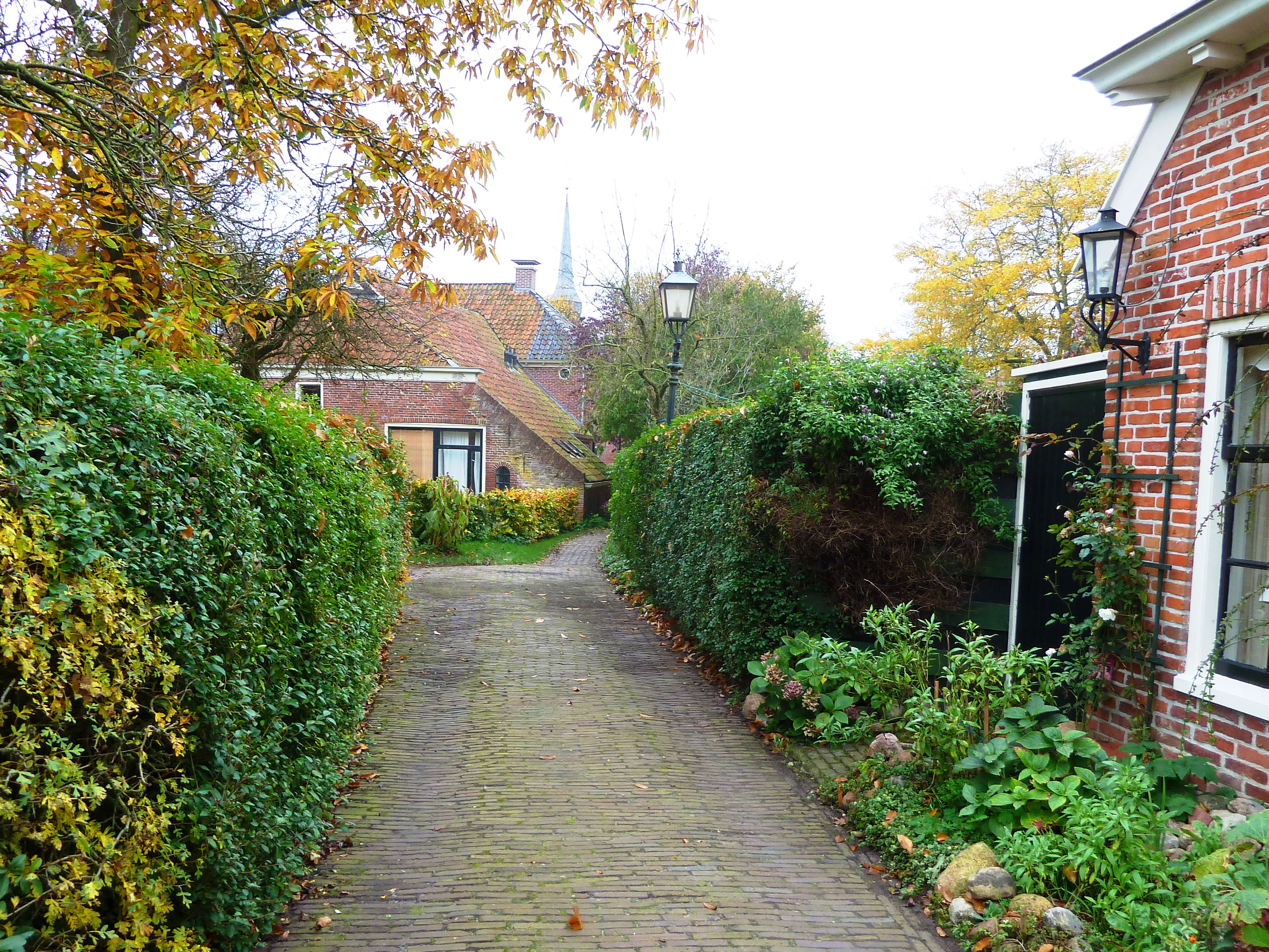
Path in Niehove

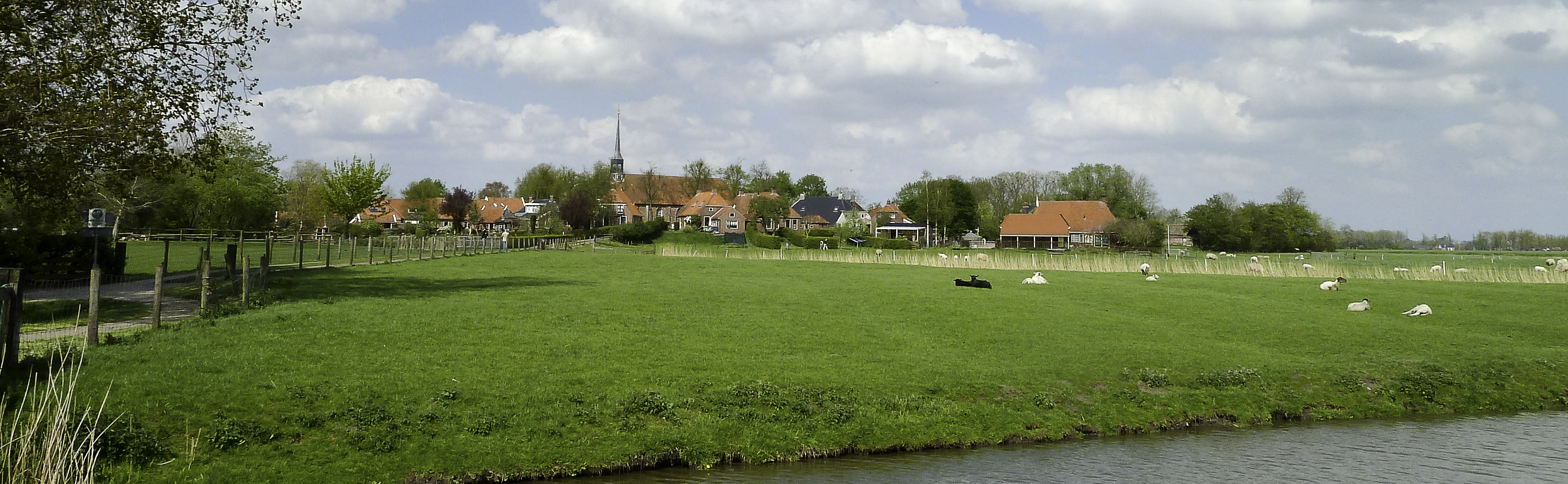
View on Niehove
