= Jacoba Hol =

Dutch geographer (1886–1964)

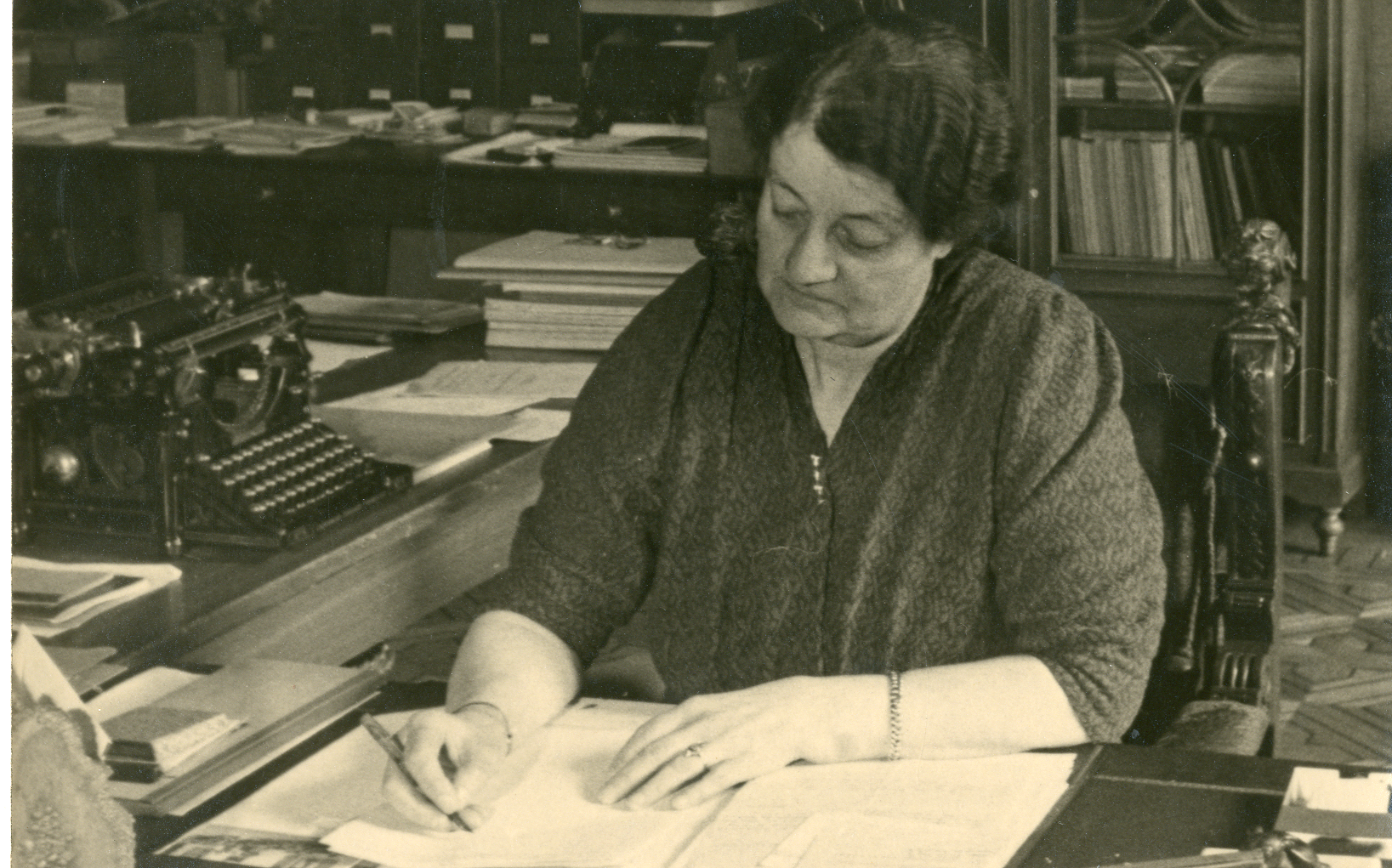
Professor Jacoba Hol, ca. 1940

Jacoba Hol (21 September 1886 – 15 October 1964) was a Dutch physical geographer. In 1945, she was appointed professor of physical geography at the Geographic Institute at Utrecht University. This made her the first female 'normal' professor in the Netherlands.

== Biography ==
Jacoba Brigitta Louisa Hol (Note: Her death certificate mentions the name Jacoba Brigitta Louisa Hol Koene.) was born in Antwerp on 21 September 1886. She was the illegitimate daughter of Maria Theresa Koene and the composer Richard Hol. In November 1907, Hol enrolled in the study of mathematics and physics at the University of Utrecht, where she graduated in 1912. Under the supervision of the physical geographer, Karl Oestreich, she wrote her dissertation on the hydrology of the Ardennes.

From 1915, she worked as Oestreich's assistant at the geographic institute at Utrecht University. Among other things, she looked into the practical organization of the educational excursions for students. In 1916, Hol graduated cum laude with her dissertation, Beiträge zur Hydrographie der Ardennen. While writing it, she started a job as a mathematics and physics teacher at a secondary school, and was appointed as a physical geography and geology teacher at the Katholieke Leergangen in Tilburg. In 1940, after 25 years of teaching, she was appointed lecturer and was officially authorized to give lectures. Hol was appointed professor in 1945, succeeding Oestreich. This made her the first female 'normal' professor in the Netherlands. In 1958, she retired at the age of almost 72 and was succeeded by Jan Zonneveld.

Hol died in Meerssen on 15 October 1964.

== Selected works ==
- Beiträge zur Hydrographie der Ardennen, 1916
- Das Problem der Talmäander. Borntraeger, 1938
- Meanders, hun beteekenis en ontstaan. Brill, 1939
- Een morfologisch probleem der Ardennen-schiervlakte, 1945
- Geomorfologie. Rijksuniversiteit, Geographisch Institut, 1948
- La genèse de la Basse-Néerlande et le désastre du 1er février, 1953
- Vijftig jaren geomorfologie. Dekker, 1957
- Quelques problèmes sur la formation des vallées. Geographisch Instituut, 1957
- De geomorfologische landschappen van Nederland. Erven JJ Tijl, 1959
