= Marcel Van den Broecke =

Dutch cartographer (1942 – 2020)

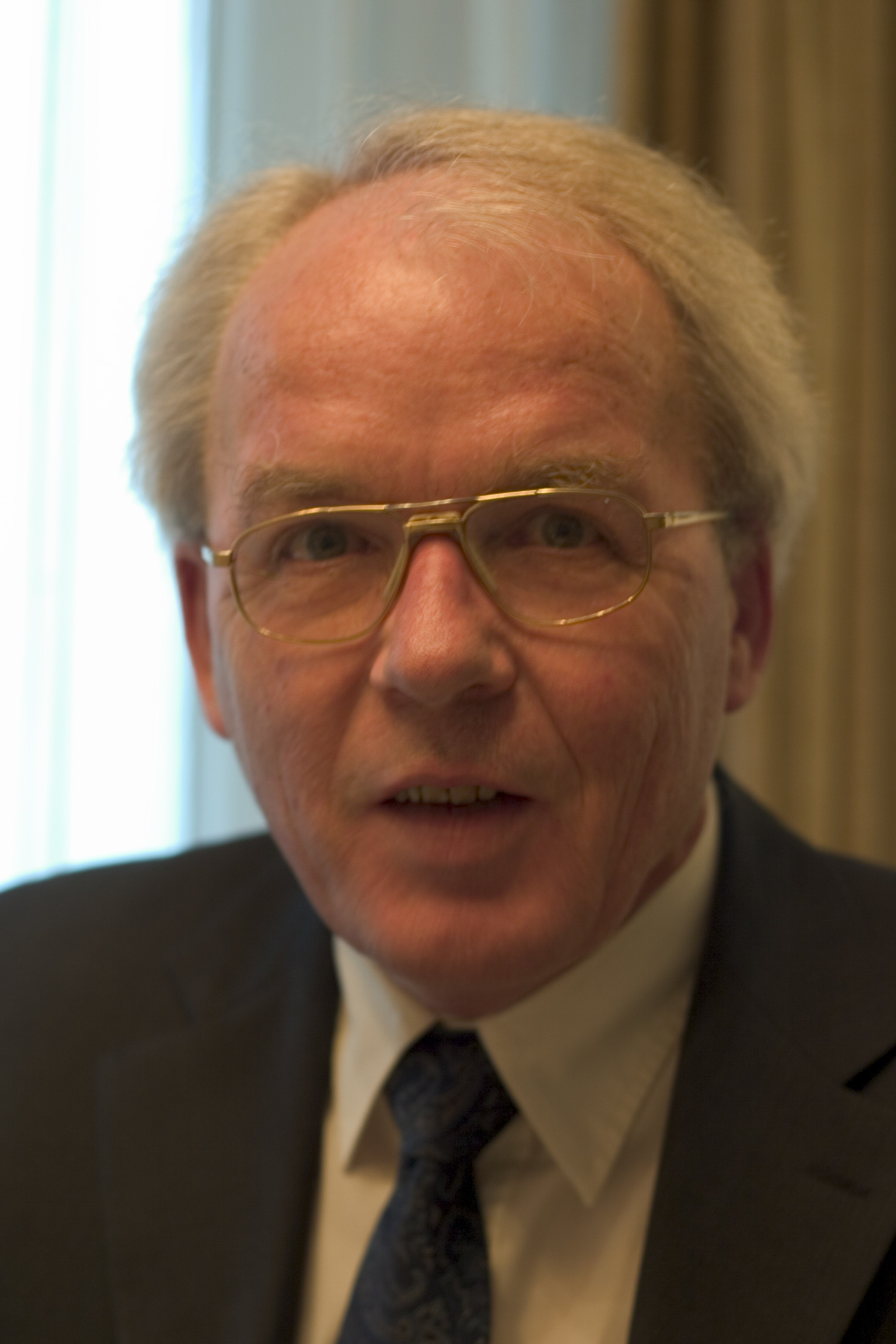
Marcel van den Broecke

Marcel Peter René van den Broecke (Amsterdam, 25 May 1942 - Bilthoven, 8 March 2020) was a Dutch specialist in phonetics and also in cartography, more in particular the historical maps by Abraham Ortelius.

== Biography ==
Van den Broecke studied at the Barlaeus Gymnasium, followed by studies in chemistry at the Brandeis-university, Waltham, Massachusetts, USA. He continued with studies in English, Language science and phonetics at the University of Amsterdam.

In 1986 he graduated as PhD at Utrecht University with his study Hierarchies and rank orders in Distinctive Features (van Gorcum, Assen).

In 1982-1983 he studied historical cartography at Utrecht University.

In 2009 he graduated as PhD in urbanistic sciences at Utrecht University, with his dissertation Ortelius, Theatrum Orbis Terrarum (1570-1641). Characteristics and development of a sample of on verso map texts (NGS 380, Utrecht, 304 pp. + cd-rom).

He was married to Dr. Deborah Günzburger and he had four sons.

== Professional activities ==
At Utrecht University he was assistant professor in English and Phonetics.

He was also:

- secretary-general of the 10th International Congress of Phonetic Sciences, Utrecht, 1983.
- editor of Sound Structures, studies presented to Antonie Cohen, Foris, 1983, in which he described his reconstruction of the speech machine of Wolfgang von Kempelen (1790).
- editor of the Progress Report of the Institute of Phonetics Utrecht (PRIPU)(1977-1988), and of the Journal of Phonetics, Academic Press, London (1985-1990).

His other academic activities included:

- directorship of the Foundation for public information on science and technology (PWT) (1988-1995);
- directorship of Humanistisch Verbond Nederland (1995-1997);
- directorship of the International Statistical Institute, The Hague (1997-2003).

== Ortelius ==
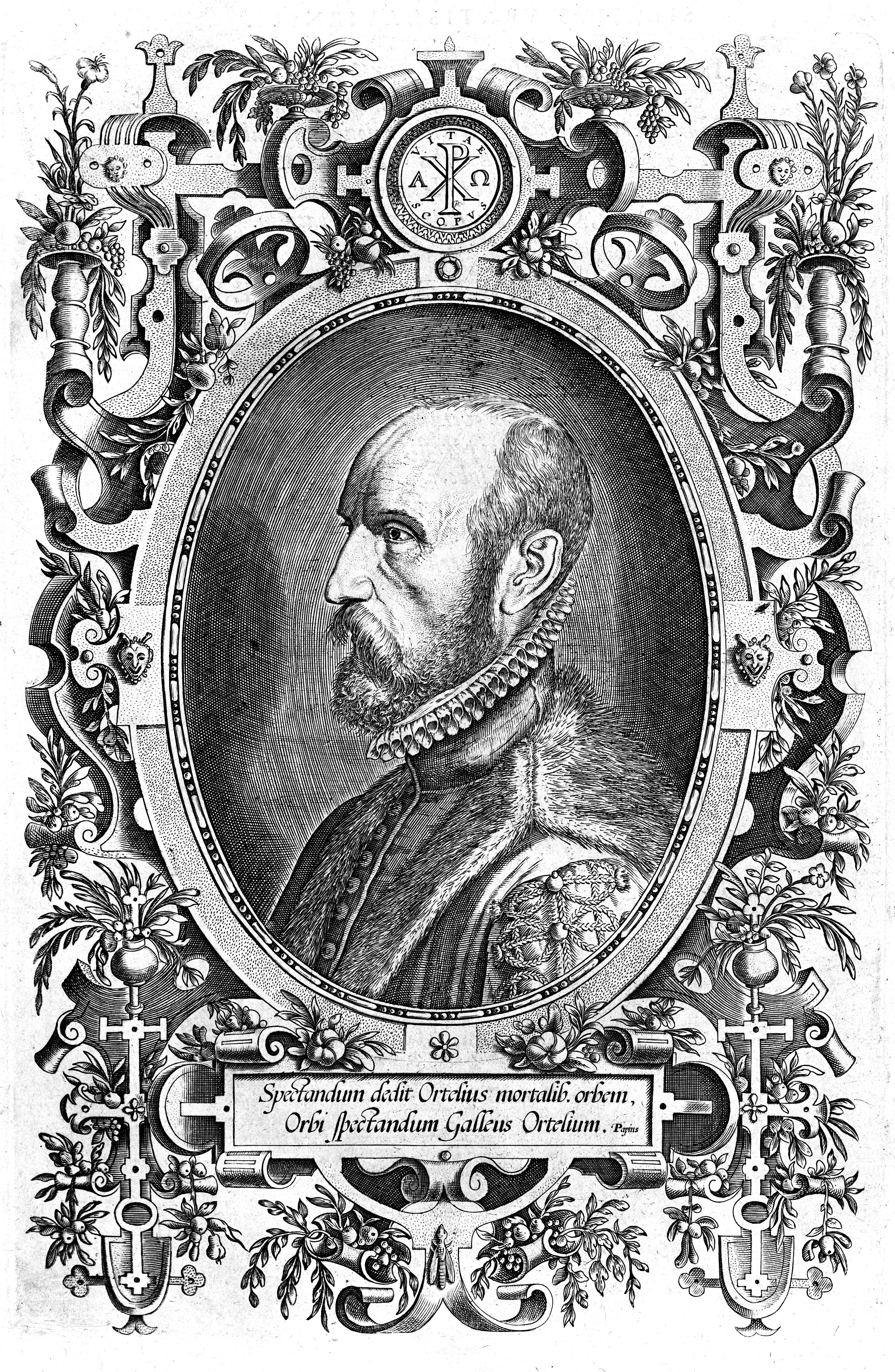
Portrait of Abraham Ortelius

From 1980 on, Marcel van den Broecke concentrated on studying old maps, and more in particular the life and works of the Antwerp cartographer Abraham Ortelius (1527-1598).

In 1996 he published Ortelius Atlas Maps, with in 2011 a new edition, rewritten and augmented.

In 1998, together with Peter van der Krogt and Peter Meurer he published Abraham Ortelius and the first atlas. Essays commemorating the Quadricentennial of his Death.

Ortelius was a friend and admirer of the Flemish cartographer Gerard Mercator.

== Publications ==
=== Phonetics ===
- Ter Sprake. Spraak als betekenisvol geluid in 36 thematische hoofdstukken (red.), Foris Publications, Dordrecht, 1988.

=== Ortelius ===
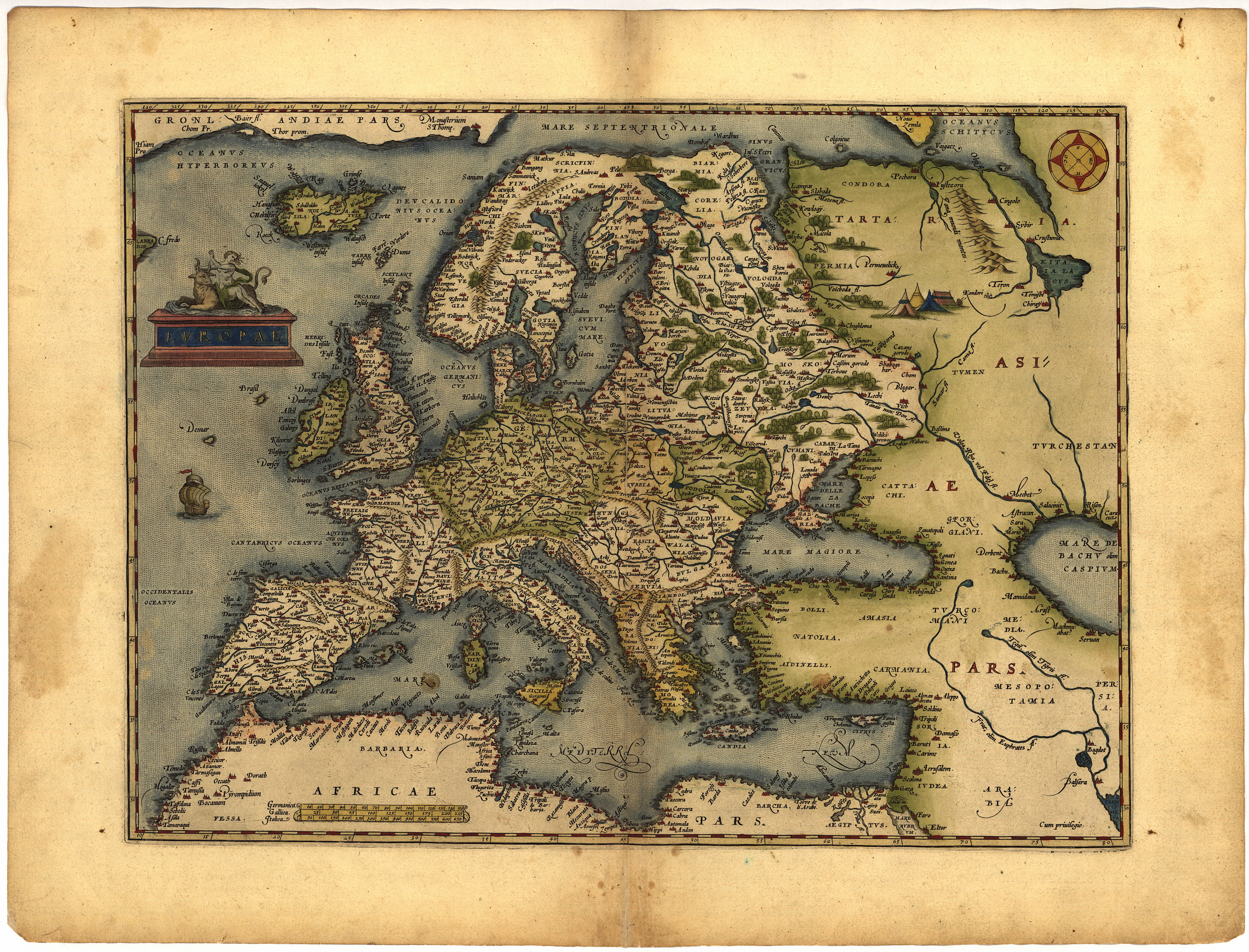
Map of Europe by Ortelius

- How rare is a map and the atlas it comes from? Facts and speculations on production and survival of Ortelius’ Theatrum Orbis Terrarum and its maps, in: The Map Collector, 1986.
- Varieties binnen edities van oude atlassen, geïllustreerd aan Ortelius’ Theatrum Orbis Terrarum, in: Caert Thresoor, 1994.
- Unstable editions of Ortelius’ atlas, in: The Map Collector, 1995.
- Ortelius zag de continenten al drijven, in: Caert-Thresoor, 1995.
- Ortelius Atlas Maps: an illustrated guide, HES Publishers, 1996.
- Platen en staten in Ortelius’ Theatrum Orbis Terrarum, in: Capita Selecta uit de geschiedenis van de cartografie, ed. P. van der Krogt. NVK publikatiereeks nr. 18, Amersfoort, Nederlandse Vereniging voor Kartografie.
- Abraham Ortelius Mercators World, 1997.
- Introduction to the Life and Works of Abraham Ortelius, in: Abraham Ortelius and the First Atlas, HES Publishers, 1998.
- The Plates of Ortelius’ Theatrum Orbis Terrarum, in: Abraham Ortelius and the First Atlas, HES Publishers, 1998.
- Unmasking a Forgery, Mercators World, 1998.
- Abraham Ortelius, grondlegger van de moderne kartografie, in: Kartografisch Tijdschrift, 1998.
- Ortelius as a Scientist, Collector and Merchant, in: Journal of the International Map Collector’s Society (Imcos) 1998.
- Historical Maps in the First Modern Atlas by Abraham Ortelius – Their Justification and Purpose, exemplified by their texts, Brussels International Map Collector Society (BIMCS), February 2002.
- Historische kaarten en hun teksten in de eerste moderne atlas van Abraham Ortelius, in: Caert-Thresoor, 2002, with an English summary.
- Correcties op het boek Ortelius Atlas Maps, in: Caert-Thresoor, 2003.
- De eerste staat van Vrients/Philip Galle's Inferioris Germaniae kaart gevonden, in: Caert-Thresoor, 2004.
- De Utopia kaart van Ortelius, in: Caert-Thresoor, 2004.
- Has the fourth Ortelius Americas plate ever been used?, in: Mapforum, 2005.
- Oceanography in Ortelius's atlas text, in: International Journal on the history of Oceanography, 2005.
- Unmasking another Ortelius atlas map forgery: Iceland, in: IMCOS Journal, 2006.
- Ortelius’ Zeeland kaart revisited, in: Caert-Thresoor, 2007.
- The significance of language: The Texts on the Verso of the Maps in Abraham Ortelius’ Theatrum Orbis Terrarum, Imago Mundi Vol. 60 Part 2, 2008.
- Ortelius’ Theatrum Orbis Terrarum (1570-1641) Characteristics and development of a sample of on verso texts, in Netherlands Geographical Studies 380, ISSN 0169-4839, ISBN 978-90-6809-423-7 KNAG The Hague.
- Ortelius’ Epitomes?, in: Caert-Thresoor, 2011.
- Ortelius Atlas Maps, An illustrated guide, Second revised edition, HES Publishers, 2011.
- Ortelius’ Brittenburg, in: Caert-Thresoor, 2011.
- Ortelius’ Engravers and Engravings. How many engravers did Ortelius employ for his maps, and how can they be identified?, in: Imcos Journal 134, Autumn 2013.
- Ortelius’ Library Reconstructed, in: Imago Mundi, 2014.
- Ortelius’ Merchandise: His Atlases, Then and Now, in: The Portolan, 2014.
- Mercator and Ortelius, two of a kind?, in: A world of innovation, Cartography in the Time of Gerhard Mercator, edited by Gerhard Holzer, Valery Newby, Petra Svatek and Georg Zotti, Cambridge Scholars Publishing, 2015.
- Abraham Ortelius, 1527–1598. His life, works, sources and friends, 2015.

Collaborations:

- (with Deborah Günzburger), The Wanderings of patriarch Abraham, in: Abraham Ortelius and the First Atlas, Marcel van den Broecke, Peter van der Krogt & Peter H. Meurer, eds., HES Publishers, 1998.
- (with Peter van der Krogt & Peter H. Meurer, eds.) Abraham Ortelius and the First Atlas, HES Publishers, 1998.
- (with Ferjan Ormeling), What's in a Name (topographical names on Ortelius’ Utopia map), in: The Map Book, Peter Barber (ed.) Weidenfeld & Nicolson, London, UK, 2005.

== Literature ==
- Obituary – Marcel P. R. van den Broecke (25 May 1942 – 8 March 2020), in: Journal of Phonetics, July 2020.
- Bookreviews about Abraham Ortelius and the First Atlas (1998)
  - John BARRET, in: Newsletter Brussels International Map Collectors Circle, 1999
  - Hans-Uli FELDMAN, in: Cartographica Helvetica, 1999
  - Jason Harris, in: Imago Mundi, 2000
- Bookreviews about Ortelius Atlas Maps, an illustrated guide (2011)
  - Wulf BODENSTEIN, in: Brussels International Map Collectors Circle, 2012.
  - Fredric SHANGER, in: The Portolan, 2012.
  - Lisette DANCKAERT, in: Caert-Tresoor, 2012.
  - Hans-Uli FELDMANN, in: Cartografica Helvetica, 2012.
  - Peter BARBER, in: The Book Collector, 2012.
  - Alfred Hiatt, in: IMCoS Journal, 2012.
