= Cornelis van Eck =

Dutch jurist and poet

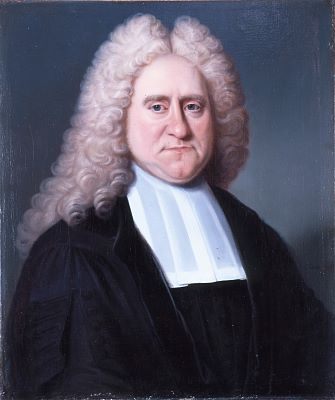
- Born: 1662; Arnhem, Dutch Republic
- Died: 1732 (aged 69–70)
- Occupation(s): Jurist and poet

Cornelis van Eck (1662–1732) was a Dutch jurist and poet.

Born in Arnhem, he studied literature in Utrecht and law in Leiden, attaining his doctorate under Johannes Voet in 1682. His dissertation, De septem damnatis legibus, saw seven re-editions. He was called upon to teach in Franeker in 1686 and was appointed to a professorship in Utrecht in 1693.

Van Eck wrote a 1689 civil law textbook, Principia juris civilis secundum ordinem Digestorem, that saw use in Dutch law courses up until the early 19th century. His Latin poetry was also well received by his contemporaries.
