= Twie Giok Tjoa =

Dutch feminist and sociologist (1943)

Twie Tjoa
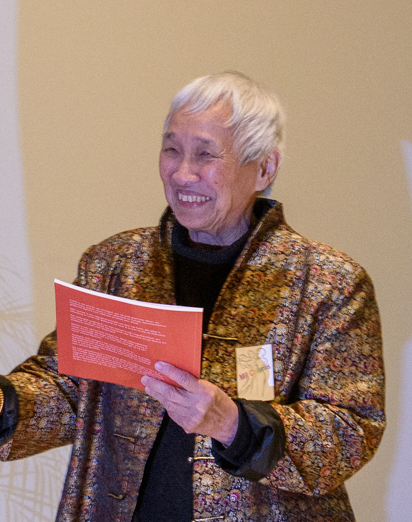
- Twie Tjoa in 2022
- Born: Twie Giok Tjoa; December 3, 1943 (age 82); Surabaya, Indonesia
- Occupations: organizational sociologist, feminist and author
- Notable work: Women in the Caribbean: 500 years of history (1992), The Cultural Heritage of Women in Multicultural Dutch Society (2008)

Twie Giok Tjoa (Twie Tjoa, born December 3, 1943) is a Dutch organizational sociologist and feminist, specialising in diversity and inclusion at work and in society as a whole. Born and raised in a Peranakan Chinese family in Surabaya, Indonesia, she fled with her parents to Suriname in 1962 to escape the persecution of Chinese people in Indonesia. She studied organizational sociology at Utrecht University in the Netherlands and, back in Suriname, became the first female director at the Ministry of Labour, Employment and Youth Affairs.

After again moving to the Netherlands in 1996, Tjoa worked in many organizations to improve the position of women, especially black, migrant and refugee women (Dutch: zwarte, migranten- en vluchtelingenvrouwen, ZMV), and the emancipation of the bicultural LGBTQ+ community. She received several Dutch awards for her work, such as the Zami Award 2009 and the Amsterdam municipal Andreaspenning, and was appointed a Knight in the Order of Orange-Nassau in 2019. Tjoa is considered to be an icon of the Dutch ZMV movement.

== Publications ==
Tjoa's publications include:

=== in English ===
- Tjoa, Twie (1992). Women in the Caribbean: 500 years of history. Instituto Venezolano de estudios sociales y politicos (INVESP). OCLC 833311016.
- Tjoa, Twie (1995). "The Political Participation of Women in Surinam from a Herstorical Perspective". Vena Journal. 7 (2): 15–19. ISSN 0925-9333. OCLC 770665092.
- Staphorst S, Tjoa T, Kromhout M, Haas-Bledoeg R, Malmberg-Guicherit HE, Lamur HE, Olton P, Khan A (1995). "Gender relations (thema)". Journal of Social Sciences / Tijdschrift voor Maatschappijwetenschappen. 2 (2). Paramaribo. OCLC 832775222.
- Tjoa, Twie; Douze, Marjet (2008). "The Cultural Heritage of Women in Multicultural Dutch Society". In Wieringa, Saskia E. (ed.). Traveling heritages: new perspectives on collecting, preserving, and sharing women's history. Amsterdam: Askant. ISBN 9789052602998. OCLC 751963325.

=== in Dutch ===
- Tjoa, Twie (1993). "Sociale programma's vanuit het perspectief van vrouwen en ontwikkeling" [Social programmes from the perspective of women and development]. Vrouwen Ook Uw Zaak: Sociaal Programma SAP (in Dutch). [Paramaribo]: Stichting Projekta. pp. 16–25. OCLC 773320198. Seminar proceedings Paramaribo 1994.
- Malmberg-Guicherit H, Tjoa T, Tromp E (1994). De positie van de vrouw in de Republiek Suriname in een periode van economische crisis en herdemocratisering: nationaal rapport [The position of women in the Republic of Suriname in a period of economic crisis and re-democratisation: national report] (in Dutch). Paramaribo: Culconsult. OCLC 68450105.
- Tjoa, Twie (1997). Zwarte, migranten- en vluchtelingenonderneemsters: wie - wat - waar [Black, migrant and refugee entrepreneurs: who - what - where] (in Dutch). Diemen: Stichting Culconsult. OCLC 68079460.
- Tjoa, Twie; Marhé, U. (1997). "Tapu sjén: bedek je schande: Surinamers en incest" [Tapu sjén: cover your shame: Surinamese and incest]. Oso: Tijdschrift voor Surinaamse taalkunde, letterkunde en geschiedenis (in Dutch). 16 (1): 102. OCLC 770728918.
- Minnaard L, Bushach P, Kohlmann C, Tjoa T (1999). Wat heeft Asten met Beijing te maken? (in Dutch). Den Haag [The Hague]: Vrouwen Alliantie voor Economische Zelfstandigheid en Herverdeling van Arbeid. OCLC 320810345.
- Tjoa T, et al. "Invloed op Europa (themanummer)". Bet/On Berichten (in Dutch). 1999 (1–2): 2–28.
- Tjoa, Twie (1999). "Forens tussen vier culturen: Chinezen in 'de Oost'" [Commuter between four cultures: Chinese in ‘the East’]. Zamikrant (in Dutch). 8 (13): 4–9. OCLC 775376950.
- Collette P, VanOsch T, Thijs A, Onstenk A, Plantenga J, et al. (2001). Mainstreaming van de zorgeconomie: discussiebundel over de economische waarde van de zorg [Mainstreaming the healthcare economy: collection of discussions on the economic value of healthcare] (in Dutch). Utrecht: Vrouwen Alliantie. ISBN 9789073908062. OCLC 66957432.
- Butalid M, Codrington W, Ilksoy A, Klinkenberg T, Tjoa T, et al. (2001). Juryrapport ZAMI-award : "Vluchtelingen 2001" (in Dutch). Amsterdam: Zami. OCLC 320881777.
- Tjoa, Twie (2001). "Oost-West verbinding: project". Vamp: Vrouwen Alliantie Media Producties (in Dutch). 1 (1): 20–21. OCLC 775379009.
- Tjoa, Twie; Thijs, Alice (2003). Hoe gelijk is gelijk? Wet- en regelgeving gelijke kansen voor vrouwen met een handicap (in Dutch). Utrecht: Vrouwen Alliantie. OCLC 428139934.
- Tjoa, Twie (2003). "Basisvoorzieningen als handelswaar?! Negatieve gevolgen van globalisering voor vrouwen" [Basic services as commodities! Negative impact of globalisation on women]. Vamp: Vrouwen Alliantie Media Producties (in Dutch). 3 (1): 14–15. OCLC 775380028.
- Tjoa T, denBrok Y, vanOsch T, et al. (2003). REA: toekomst voor vrouwen!? Reïntegratie van vrouwen met een chronische ziekte [REA: a future for women!? Reintegration of women with chronic illnesses] (in Dutch). 's-Hertogenbosch; Utrecht: CINOP; Vrouwen Alliantie. OCLC 428093376.
- Tjoa T, et al. (2016). Caleidoscopia, Spelen met Diversiteit: Theorie, Praktijk en Ervaring [Kaleidoscopia, Playing with Diversity: Theory, Practice and Experience] (in Dutch). Garant. ISBN 9789044134087. OCLC 1346719415. 127 pages.

== Biography ==
- Bos, Marten (2022). Twie Tjoa: Liefde in beweging [Twie Tjoa: Love in motion]. Roze Levensboeken (in Dutch). Amsterdam: Stichting IHLIA. OCLC 1386289277. 84 pages.
