= Bert Mosselmans =

Bert Mosselmans (born 1969) is a professor of economics and philosophy. He was the dean of Vesalius College, Brussels, Belgium from 2007 until 2014. He is professor of economics and philosophy at University College Roosevelt, Middelburg, the Netherlands. He received an MSc in Business Engineering (1992), an MA in philosophy (1994) and a PhD in economics (1999) from the Vrije Universiteit Brussel, Belgium. His research focuses on the history of economic thought, mainly the 19th century and the first half of the 20th century, and with a special interest in the history of microeconomics and industrial organization. He has published extensively on the history of economic thought and the history of philosophy, most notably on William Stanley Jevons, a 19th-century British philosopher and economist. His research appeared in journals such as The European Journal of the History of Economic Thought and History of Political Economy.

Bert Mosselmans has received the Best Article Award of the European Society for the History of Economic Thought in 2000 and the Joseph Dorfman Award of the History of Economics Society in 2001.
