= European Child & Adolescent Psychiatry =

- Discipline: Child and adolescent psychiatry
- Language: English
- Edited by: Johannes Hebebrand

Publication details
- History: 1992-present
- Publisher: Springer Science+Business Media
- Frequency: Monthly
- Impact factor: 4.785 (2020)

Standard abbreviations
- ISO 4: Eur. Child Adolesc. Psychiatry

Indexing
- CODEN: EAPSE9
- ISSN: 1018-8827 (print); 1435-165X (web)
- LCCN: sn92033426
- OCLC no.: 26585556

Links
- Journal homepage; Online archive

European Child & Adolescent Psychiatry is a monthly peer-reviewed medical journal covering child and adolescent psychiatry. It was established in 1992 and is published by Springer Science+Business Media on behalf of the European Society for Child and Adolescent Psychiatry, of which it is the official journal. The editor-in-chief is Johannes Hebebrand (University of Duisburg-Essen). According to the Journal Citation Reports, the journal has a 2020 impact factor of 4.785.
