= George Weijer =

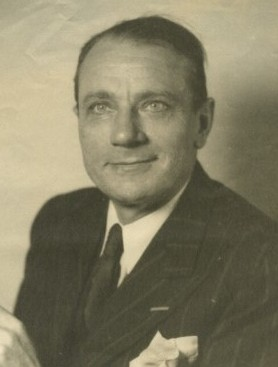
- Born: 14 September 1891; Weststellingwerf, Netherlands
- Died: 8 June 1979 (aged 87); Amsterdam, Netherlands
- Other name: George Antoon Philip Weijer
- Occupations: Accountant, business representative, university professor, company director, government advisor
- Years active: 1911–1979

George Antoon Philip Weijer (1891-1979) was a business representative in colonial Indonesia, an economics professor at the University of Utrecht, and a government advisor and company director in the Netherlands.

== Early life ==
Weijer was born in Weststellingwerf on 14 September 1891. His father was Philippus Weijer (1857-1939), a typographer and book printer. His mother was Antje Giezen (1858-1898). He was the fourth of six children. Weijer attended Hogere Burgerschool in Hilversum and subsequently earned a teaching certificate in 1909.

== Career ==
=== 1911-1934 ===
After completing his military service in 1910, Weijer left for colonial Indonesia in January 1911. He first worked as an accountant with Dordtsche Petroleum Maatschappij (DPM) in Surabaya. Weijer became DPM's local representative in Surabaya in 1916. Following a DPM merger with Bataafsche Petroleum Maatschappij (BPM), Weijer became BPM representative in Semarang in 1918.

After a year in the Netherlands in 1919, he returned to Indonesia in 1920 and worked at the trading company Internatio, becoming its Semarang agent in 1924. He served as a member of the Semarang City Council from 1923 to 1925. For family reasons, he returned to the Netherlands in 1928, where the Bank of Amsterdam (Amsterdamsche Bank) appointed him as an attorney for the bank's financial affairs in Sumatra. Weijer analyzed aspects of colonial Indonesia's economy in this position, mainly rubber and sugar production and marketing.

Weijer returned to Surabaya in 1932 to become chief representative (hoofdagent) of the Colonial Bank (Koloniale Bank). In this position, Weijer represented the financial sector in the supervisory board of the Association of Entrepreneurs in the Netherlands Indies (Ondernemersbond voor Nederlandsch-Indië, OBNI) until 1934.

=== 1934-1937 ===
During OBNI board meetings, Weijer expressed reservations about the support of OBNI and particularly its president George H.C. Hart. Hart supported interventionist policies of the colonial government in combating the effects of the deep crisis after 1929. For that reason, OBNI's counterpart in the Netherlands, the Council of Entrepreneurs in the Netherlands Indies (Ondernemersraad voor Nederlandsch-Indië, ORNI), favored him as Hart's successor after Hart was appointed Director of Economic Affairs in the government of colonial Indonesia in August 1934.

As president of OBNI, Weijer led the ‘economic faction’ in the Volksraad, the parliament of colonial Indonesia. The differing views of Hart and Weijer on economic policy drew public attention in 1935. While Hart advocated a greater degree of economic autonomy for Indonesia, Weijer emphasized Indonesia and the Netherlands' economic unity. Hart also supported a proactive policy of encouraging industrialization to create new employment and income opportunities in Java through company regulation and protective trade policies. Weijer expressed reservations and argued that policies of adjustment to suit lower government income and lower prices due to an appreciation of the real exchange rate would be sufficient.

Weijer refused to cooperate with labor unions towards labor market regulation. He later argued that OBNI was ‘not competent’ in this matter because it was not an organization of employers but entrepreneurs.

=== 1938-1950 ===
For health reasons, Weijer resigned from the OBNI presidency in 1937. He returned to the Netherlands, where he associated with various companies, starting with a directorship of the Netherlands branch of the Nederlands-Indische Escomptomij, one of the largest Dutch-owned banks in Indonesia.

In June 1938, he was appointed Professor of ‘Tropical Economics’ (Tropische Staathuishoudkunde) at the Faculty for Indonesian Studies (Indologische Faculteit) of the University of Utrecht in the Netherlands. This faculty had been established in 1925 to train employees for the private and public service in colonial Indonesia. Companies operating in Indonesia supported the faculty with donations to a dedicated foundation (Het Fonds ten Behoeve van Indologische Studiën). The faculty was better known in the Netherlands as the ‘Oil Faculty’ (‘oliefaculteit’) due to financial support of the oil multinational BPM (later Royal Dutch Shell).

Weijer was appointed professor despite his uncompleted university education or a doctoral thesis and without major academic papers in economics. However, he had published on economic topics in professional journals. The subject of his inaugural lecture in September 1938 was ‘Welfare Policy in the Netherlands Indies,’ in which he lauded the colonial government's efforts to reduce poverty and improve prosperity since 1900, particularly during the crisis of the early 1930s.

In addition to his academic commitments, Weijer accumulated associations with private companies. After 1945, he assumed official roles. During 1945-47 Weijer was a Dutch delegation member to the Far Eastern Commission in Washington, which oversaw the Allied Council for Japan in Tokyo. He chaired the commission that prepared the Dutch claim for war reparations against Japan in 1946.

In 1947, Weijer was briefly appointed economic advisor to Lt Governor-General H.J. van Mook in Indonesia. Weijer's view on Indonesia's independence was that any agreement would have to preserve the economic ties between the Netherlands and Indonesia at all cost. In this he differed from Van Mook and leading sections of the private sector in Indonesia, who advocated Indonesia's independence on terms favorable to Indonesia's society and economy. Following Van Mook's resignation in October 1948, Weijer became an advisor to the Dutch Minister for Foreign Affairs, Dirk Stikker, during 1948–49.

U.S. President Harry S. Truman's inaugural ‘Four Point Speech’ in January 1949 called on the U.S. to ‘embark on a bold new program for making the benefits of our scientific advances and industrial progress available for the improvement and growth of underdeveloped areas.’ In this context, Weijer proposed to convert his faculty at the University of Utrecht to a faculty for non-Western social sciences, which happened in 1950.

Although the new faculty did not teach economics, Weijer retained his professor title and continued his association with the University of Utrecht while working during 1950-52 as Director of the European and North-American Department van het International Monetary Fund in Washington DC.

=== 1937-1979 ===
After 1937, he undertook mostly non-executive positions with various firms.

His most substantive positions were with the Netherlands Association for Industry and Trade (Nederlandsche Maatschappij voor Nijverheid en Handel, NMNH). Since 1788, NMNH had facilitated contact between private firms and academia. By the 1930s, the NMNH organized conferences and public lectures and acted as a private sector think-tank. Governments consulted the NMNH on economic policy. Weijer was vice-president (1939–45) and President (1947–50 and 1953–57). Also, Weijer was Managing Director of Escomptomij during 1945–50.

During his time at NMNH and Escomptomij, Dutch companies appointed Weijer to non-executive directorships on their supervisory boards. In years that followed, he became executive and non-executive director of other companies. For example, in 1939, he became director of De Bijenkorf department stores and in 1950 of mining company Mijnbouw Maatschappij Zuid-Bantam.

He continued most of these positions after his formal retirement from the NMNH in 1957. Among others, he was then president-director of Algemeene Nederlandsch-Indische Electriciteits-Maatschappij, Industrieele Maatschappij Palembang, and Cultuur en Handelmaatschappij Sedep, and director of the Nederlandse Overzee Bank, Handelsvennootschap Maintz & Co, Algemene Commerciële Associatie, Van Berkels’ Patent, Smit & Co Electrotechnische Fabrieken, Industriële Maatschappij Berk-Beccon (BK), Lease Plan Nederland, Handel-Maatschappij and AMRO Bank.

== Personal life ==
Weijer married Franz Hermien Neumann (1890-1988) from Singosari (Malang) in 1913. They had one son, Menno George Weijer (1915-1999).

Weijer was a freemason. On his formal retirement in 1957, Weijer was appointed a Commander of the Order of Orange-Nassau (Commandeur in de Orde van Oranje-Nassau). He received the medal of the NMNH in 1957 in recognition of his services to the association. He remained active in several private enterprise positions. He was made Knight of the Order of Orange-Nassau (Ridder in de Orde van Oranja Nassau) before his death on 8 June 1979 in Amsterdam.

== Publications ==
- (1911) ‘De Interest Berekening‘ [The calculation of interest]. Groningen: Postma (with J.R. van Groen).
- (1929) ‘Opkoop van bevolkingsriet in de afdeeling Malang’ [Purchase of smallholder sugar cane in Malang residency], Koloniale Studiën, 13(1) 15–46.
- (1929) ‘Het indexcijfer van “De Economist”’ [The price index of The Economist], De Economist, 78(1) 114-119.
- (1929) ‘Waarom géén subsidie aan de Nederlandsche suikerindustrie?’ [Why no subsidy for the sugar industry in Indonesia?], Economisch-Statistische Berichten, 14(690) 272–274.
- (1929) ‘Het nieuwe rubberplan’ [The new rubber restriction plan], Economisch-Statistische Berichten, 14(723) 989–991.
- (1929) ‘Het plan van de Rubber Growers Association’ [The plan of the Rubber Growers Association], Economisch-Statistische Berichten, 14(727) 1081–1082.
- (1930) ‘De crisis in de rubbercultuur’ [The crisis in the rubber industry], Economisch-Statistische Berichten, 15(768) 824-825 and (769) 846–848.
- (1931) ‘Een georganiseerde termijnmarkt voor suiker op Java’ [An organised futures market for sugar in Java], Economisch-Statistische Berichten, 16 (788) 124-125 and (791) 200–201.
- (1931) ‘Het rapport van de Commissie voor het Rubbervraagstuk’ [The report of the committee to consider the rubber issue], Economisch-Statistische Berichten, 16(815) 712–715.
- (1932) ‘Rubber’, De Economist, 81(1) 97-125.
- (1935) ‘De tegenwoordige economische positie van Nederlandsch-Indië’ [The current economic position of colonial Indonesia], Kwartaalbericht van de Amsterdamsche Bank (September 1935). Also published as ‘Die gegenwärtige Wirtschaftslage in Niederländisch Indien’ in Finanzwirtschaftliche Uebersicht der Statistischen Abteilung No.45 (October 1935). Amsterdam: Amsterdamsche Bank.
- (1938) Welvaartszorg in Nederlandsch-Indië: Rede uitgesproken bij de aanvaarding van het ambt van bijzonder hoogleeraar in de tropische staathuishoudkunde aan de Rijksuniversiteit te Utrecht op Maandag 26 September 1938 [Prosperity care in colonial Indonesia: Oration on the occasion of accepting the position of professor in tropical economics at the University of Utrecht on Monday 26 September 1938]. Amsterdam: De Bussy.
- (1939) ‘L’empire colonial de la Hollande: Discours’ [The Dutch colonial empire: speech], La Vie, 28(5) 66–70.
- (1941) ‘De groote cultures’ [Large agricultural enterprises in Indonesia] in W.H. van Helsdingen and H. Hoogenberk (eds.) Daar wèrd wat groots verricht: Nederlandsch-Indië in de XXste eeuw. (Amsterdam: Elsevier) 286–321.
- (1945) ‘De economische betrekkingen tusschen Nederland en Nederlandsch-Indië en Japan [Economic relations between the Netherlands and The Netherlands Indies and Japan] in A.C.D. de Graaff et al. (eds.) Van Vriend tot Vijand De Betrekkingen tussen Nederlandsch-Indië en Japan. (Amsterdam: Elsevier) 290-294.
- (1945) Holland and the Netherland Indies: Some Economic Aspects. New York: The Netherlands Information Bureau.
- (1945) ‘Nederland's taak in Indië’ [The Netherlands' duty in Indonesia], Economisch-Statistische Berichten, No.1476 (1 August 1945).
- (1949) ‘De toekomst van de Nederlandse studerende jeugd in het algemeen en die van de Indologen en Ind. juristen in het bijzonder’ [The future of Dutch university students and those why studies Indonesia and Indonesian law in particular], P.I.T. Orgaan van de Utrechtse Indologenvereniging, 15(2) 1-10.
- (1955) De Middengrote Onderneming [The medium-sized enterprise]. Haarlem: Nederlandsche Maatschappij voor Nijverheid en Handel. (101pp.
