= Anton August van Vloten =

Dutch agriculturalist

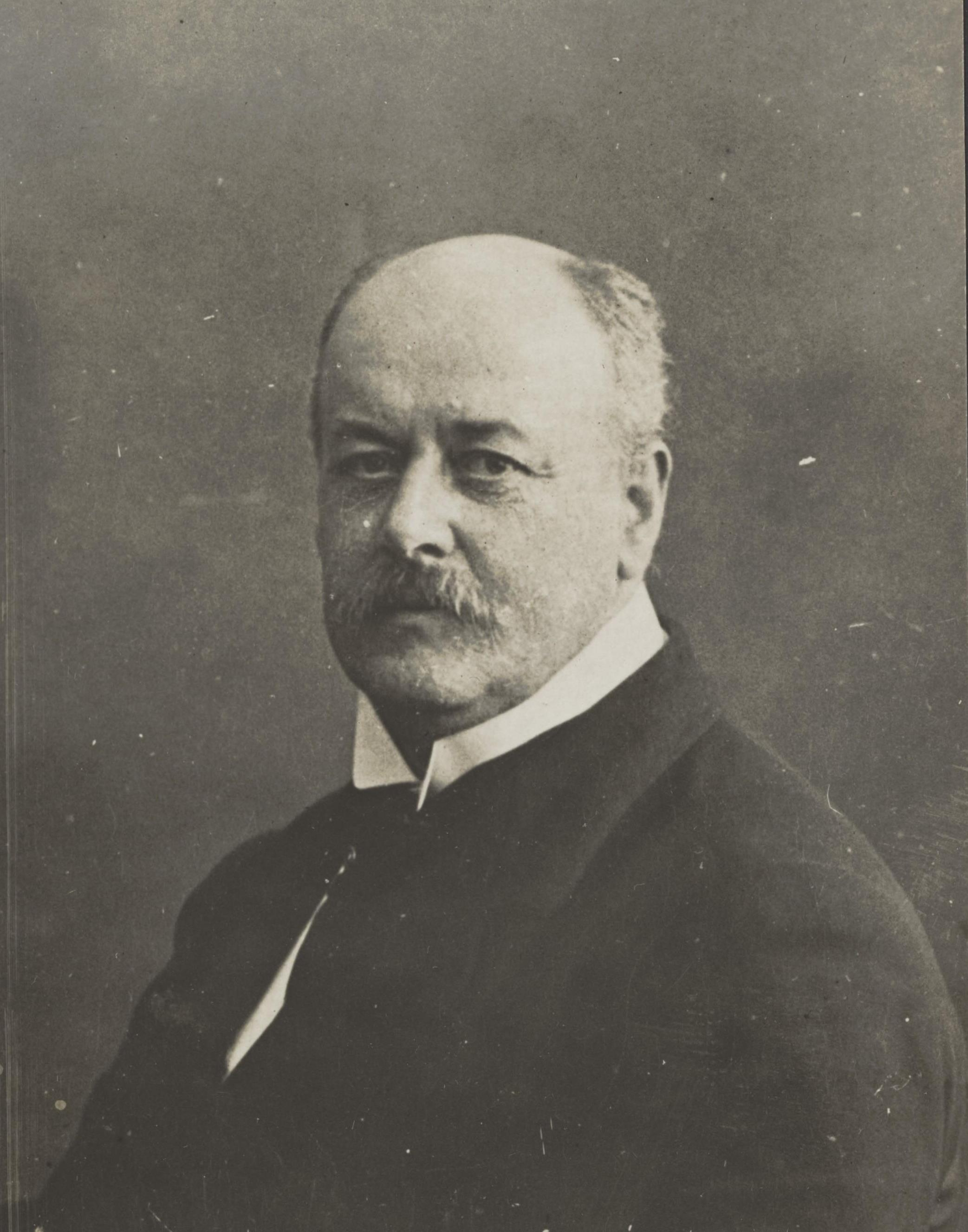
- Anton August van Vloten in 1920
- Occupations: Politician, businessman

Anton August van Vloten (Paiton, Probolinggo Regency, 1864 – Maarssen, Stichtse Vecht, 1920) was a Dutch agriculturalist. He was the founder of the Maarsseveense Stoomzuivelfabriek (a steam-powered diary factory) and director of the Waterschap Bethune water board. He also was alderman of Maarsseveen.

== Biography ==
Van Vloten was knowledgeable in agricultural techniques and established the Maarsseveense Stoomzuivelfabriek, a butter factory which used steam power. This however became a failure because the land near the Bethunepolder was too inundated, which made the holding of livestock upon which the factory depended too hard and he therefore had to spend too much money on pumping. Afterwards Van Vloten entered the horticulture business but this also didn't become a great success.

Van Vloten was council member and alderman in the municipality Maarsseveen.

== See also ==
- Van Vloten (family)
