= Karl Heilbronner =

German psychiatrist

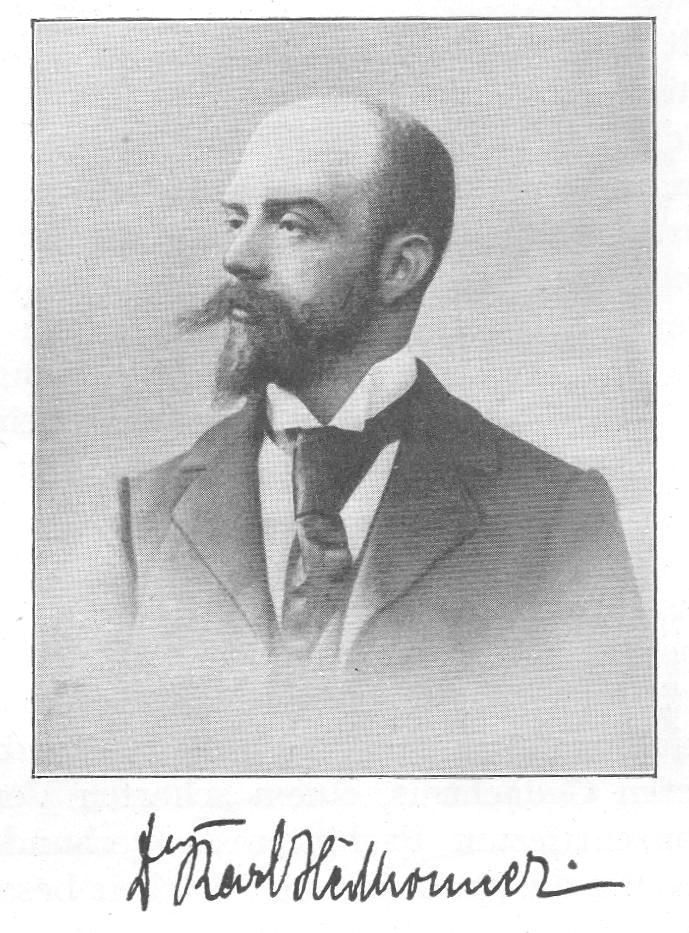
Karl Heilbronner (1869–1914)

Karl Heilbronner (21 November 1869, in Nuremberg – 8 September 1914, in Utrecht) was a German psychiatrist. He specialized in research of apraxia, depression and obsessive behavior disorders.

He studied medicine at the Ludwig-Maximilians-Universität München as a pupil of Hubert von Grashey, obtaining his doctorate in 1894. He later worked as an assistant to Carl Wernicke at Breslau (1894–98), followed by service as a senior physician under Eduard Hitzig at the University of Halle. In 1903, he succeeded Theodor Ziehen as a full professor of psychiatry at Utrecht University.

== Associated eponym ==
- "Heilbronner's sign": (Heilbronner thigh) - In cases of organic paralysis, a flattening and broadening of the thigh when the patient lies supine on a hard surface.

== Selected works ==
- Über Krankheitsdauer und Todesursachen bei der progressiven Paralyse, 1894 – On duration of illness and causes of death in progressive paralysis.
- Aphasie und Geisteskrankheit, 1896 – Aphasia and insanity.
- Über Asymbolie, 1897 – On asymbolia.
- Über Gewöhnung auf normalen und pathologischen Gebiete, 1912 – On habituation in normal and pathological areas.
