= Willem Anton van Vloten =

Dutch dermatologist (1941–2025)

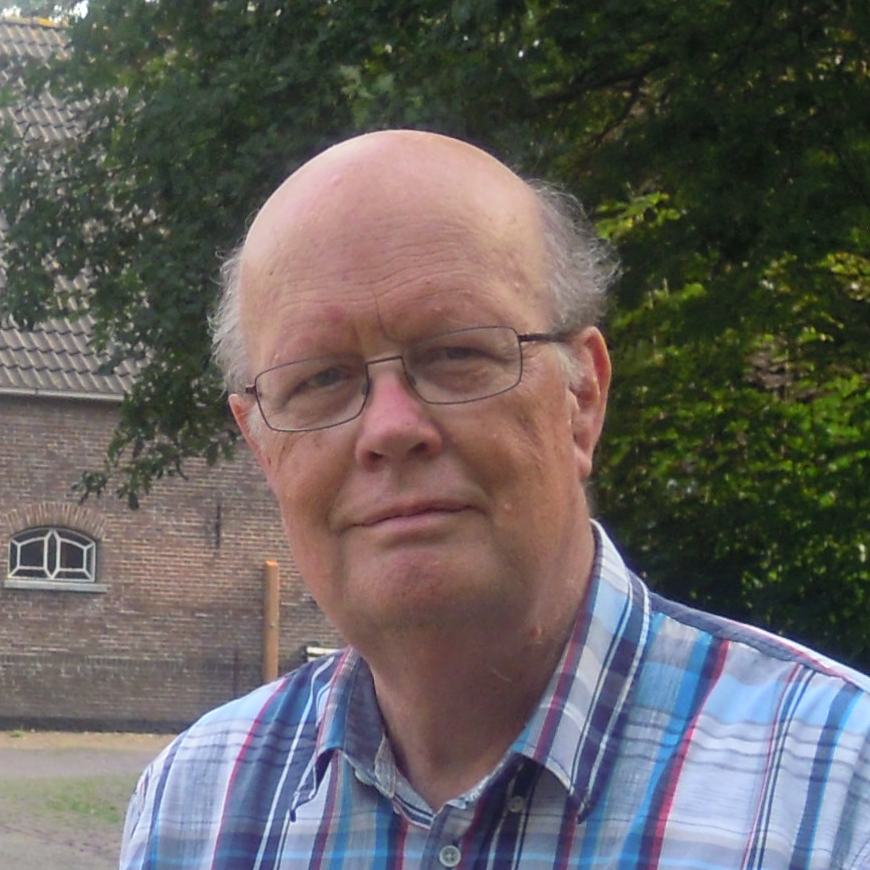
- Van Vloten in 2015
- Born: 7 June 1941; Bandung, Dutch East Indies
- Died: 25 September 2025 (aged 84); Wageningen, Netherlands
- Education: University of Leiden
- Scientific career
- Fields: Dermatology

Willem Anton van Vloten (7 June 1941 – 25 September 2025) was a Dutch dermatologist.

== Life and career ==
Van Vloten studied medicine at the University of Leiden where he graduated on 19 June 1974. He was appointed a professor of dermatology and venereology in 1980. Later he was appointed a dermatology professor at the University of Utrecht on 8 November 1984 and worked there till 1 June 2001.

In 1999, he won the Van Vlissingenprijs of the Foundation 'Ank van Vlissingen Fonds' which is given to persons and institutions which contributed much to the research of the causes and treatment of malignant lymph node diseases and the improvement of the quality of life of the patients who suffer from such afflictions.

Van Vloten died in Wageningen on 25 September 2025, at the age of 84.

== Works ==
- (in Dutch) De betekenis van DNA cytofotometrie voor de vroegtijdige diagnostiek van mycosis fungoides (thesis Rijksuniversiteit van Leiden)
- (in Dutch) Dermatologie en venereologie, W.A. van Vloten, H.J. Degreef, E. Stolz, B.J. Vermeer, R. Willemze (editor) ISBN 9789035222687
- (in Dutch) Het geslacht van Vloten. Genealogie met biografische aantekeningen., W.A. van Vloten, Th.J. van Vloten, Wageningen 1995

== See also ==
- Van Vloten (family)
