= Johannes Voet =

Dutch jurist

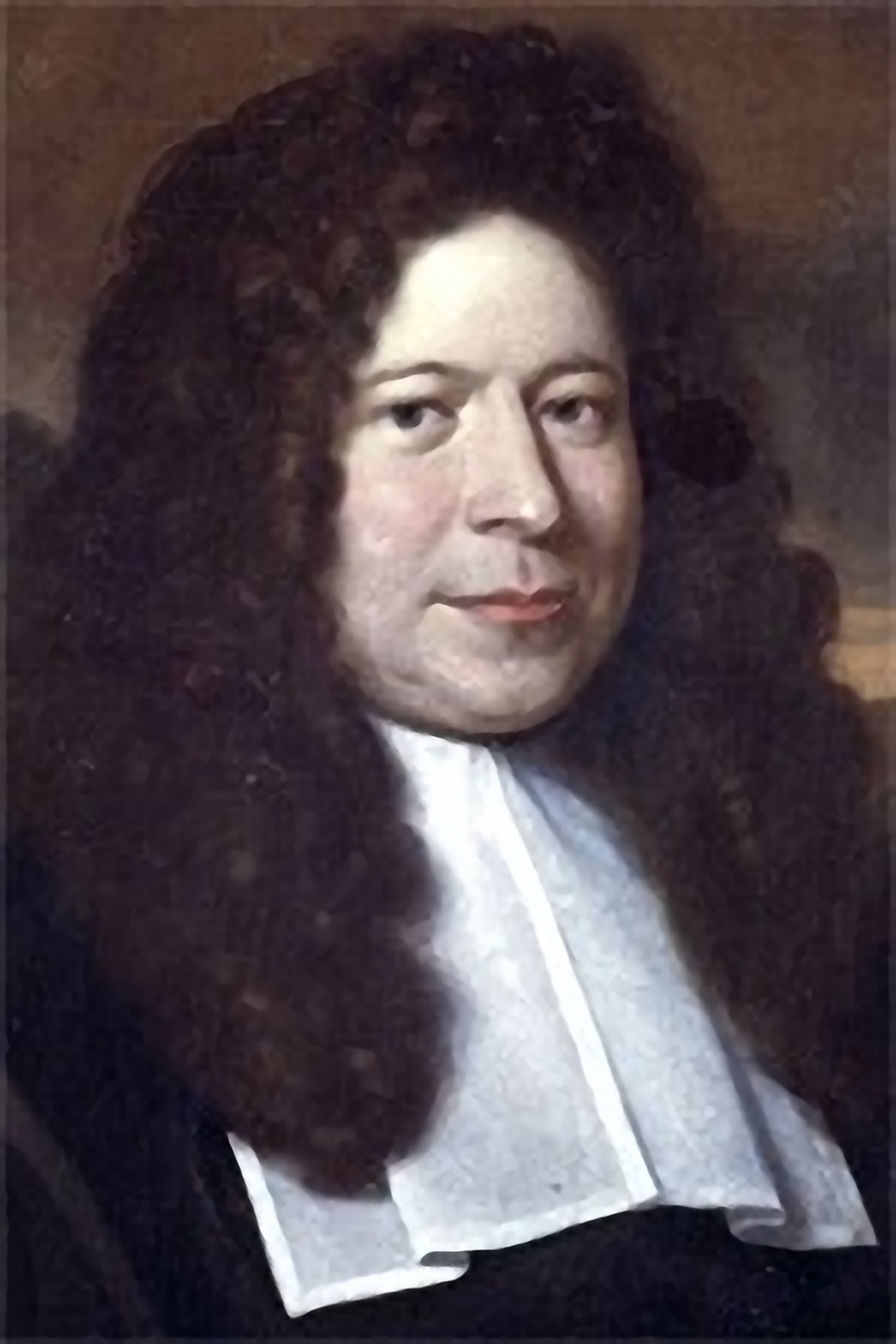
- Portrait of Johannes Voet
- Born: 3 October 1647; Utrecht, Dutch Republic
- Died: 11 September 1713 (aged 65); Utrecht, Dutch Republic

Education
- Education: Utrecht University

Philosophical work
- Era: Renaissance philosophy
- Region: Western philosophy
- School: Natural law
- Main interests: Roman-Dutch law

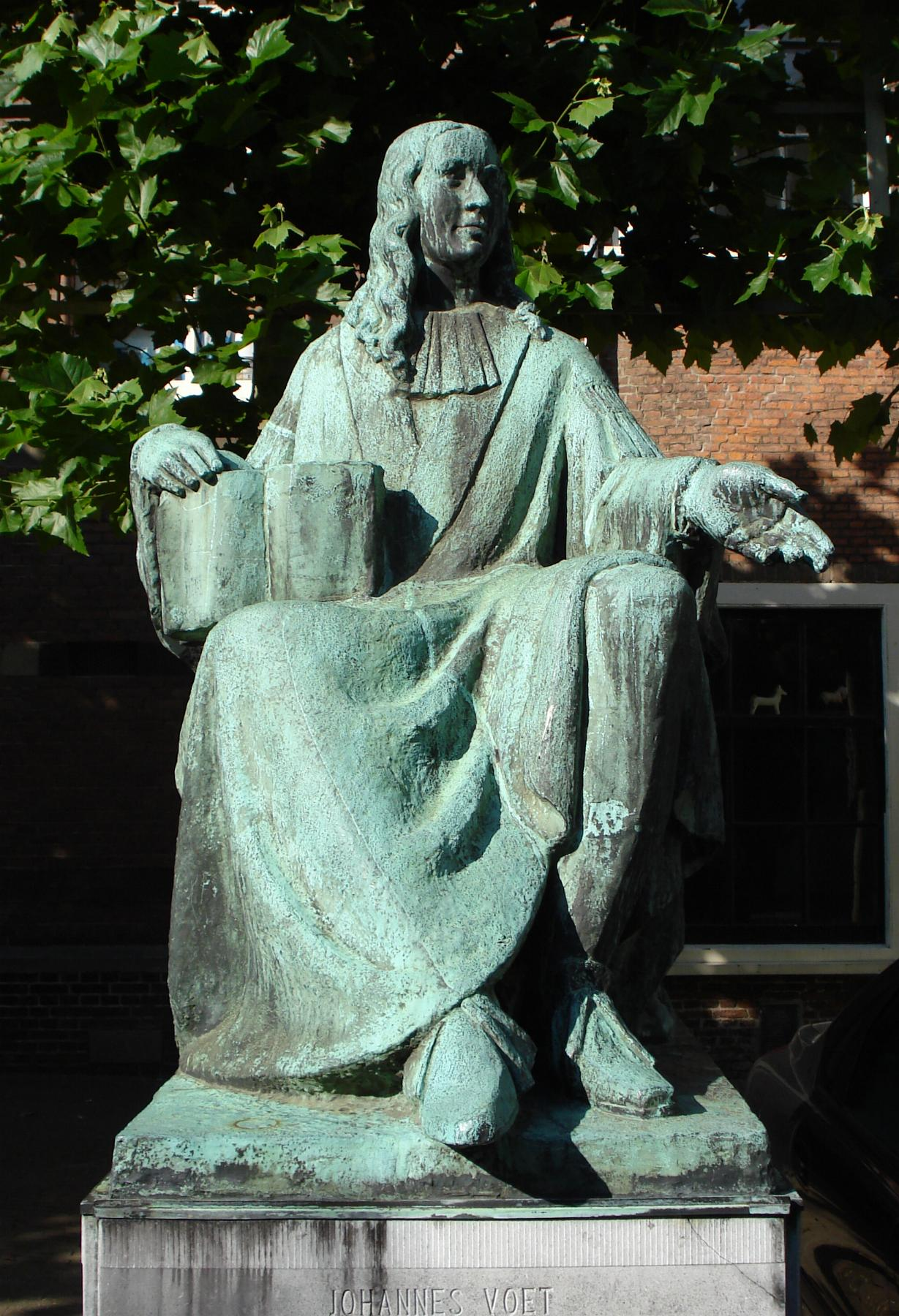
Statue of Johannes Voet in The Hague

Johannes Voet (Dutch: [vut]), also known as John Voet (3 October 1647 – 11 September 1713), was a Dutch jurist whose work remains highly influential in modern Roman-Dutch law.

Voet is one of the so-called "old authorities" of Roman-Dutch law, along with Hugo Grotius, Simon van Leeuwen (nl), Joan Cos, Gerhard Noodt, Zacharias Huber, Cornelius van Bynkershoek, Hobins van der Vorm, Gerloff Scheltinga (de), Willem Schorer (nl), Franciscus Lievens Kersteman, J. Munniks, Hendrik Jan Arntzenius (fr), Arent Lybrechts, Johan Jacob van Hasselet, Gerard de Haas, Cornelis Willem Decker, Didericus Lulius, Renier van Spaan, Dionysius Godefridus van der Keessel, and Johan van der Linden.

== Life ==
Voet was born in Utrecht, the son of Paulus Voet, who was the son of the famous theologian Gisbertus Voetius. He probably studied in Utrecht, after which he became a professor in Herborn. In 1673 he was made professor of law at Utrecht University. From 1680 to his death he was a professor and the chair of law at Leiden, being twice elected as rector. He was a deacon in the Dutch Reformed Church and later worked for the Church as an accountant. He died in Utrecht.

== Work ==
Voet's most famous work is his Commentarius ad Pandectas (i.e. Commentary on the Digest) (1698). Unlike other jurists of his day, Voet's Commentary on the Digest was not a mere academic treatise but also an attempt to show how that law applied day-to-day in practice. While the Commentary shows signs of legal humanism, it may also be considered a Dutch form of Usus modernus Pandectarum.

Unlike the work of Hugo Grotius and Simon van Leeuwen with which Voet's Commentary has been compared, Voet, as a teacher of law, wrote in Latin and not Dutch, as Latin at the time was the teaching language. Like Grotius, Voet relied upon the theory of natural law as the basis for his systematization of the law.

In the 19th century, Voet's Commentary was translated into German. It is still an important source of South African law, the common law of which is Roman-Dutch. Sir Henry de Villiers, Chief Justice of the Cape Colony and later of South Africa, made much use of Voet's Commentary.

The philosopher David Hume recalled being required to read Voet's Commentary while studying Law in Edinburgh.

His other works include:

- Compendiem juris adjectis differentiis Civilis et Canonici (1682)
- Commentarius ad pandectas : in quo, praeter Romani juris principia ac controversias illustriores, jus etiam hodiernum et praecipuae fori quaestiones excutiuntur
- De Usufructu (1704)
- Elementa juris secundum ordinem Inst. Justiniani (translated into Dutch as De Beginzels des Rechts, that is, The Principles of the Law) – a commentary on the Institutes of Justinian.
- De familia erciscunda
- De jure Militari
- De Tutoribus
