= Willem George Pluygers =

Dutch classics professor and librarian

Willem Pluygers
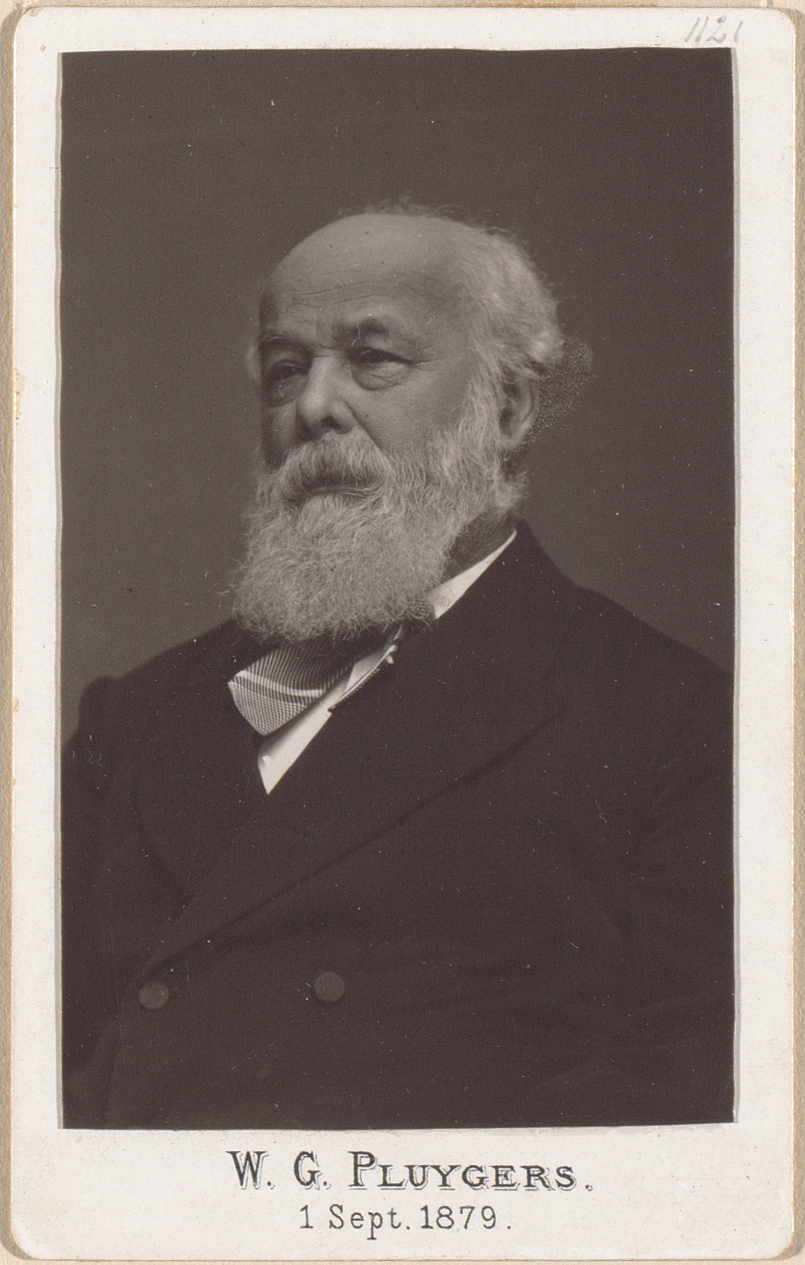
- Goedeljee, Jan (1824–1906): W.G. Pluygers, 1 September 1879. Collection Leiden University Library.
- Born: Willem George Pluygers; 18 February 1812; Zwolle, the Netherlands
- Died: 30 April 1880 (aged 68); Leiden, the Netherlands
- Education: Leiden University
- Scientific career
- Fields: classical archeology, Latin and Greek antiquities
- Workplaces: Leiden University
- Thesis: Specimen academicum litterarium, continens diatriben de Demade, quod annuente summo numine, Leiden 1836

Willem George Pluygers (1812–1880) was a Dutch classical scholar, university professor and librarian.

== Biography ==
Pluygers was born the son of a minister in Zwolle, the Netherlands, and studied in Voorschoten before reading classics at Leiden University. A member of the Leidse Jagers - a student military unit - he fought in the 1831 Ten days' campaign to subdue the rebellious Belgians. After obtaining a Leiden doctorate in 1836 he became a classics teacher and deputy headmaster, first at the gymnasium in Delft and later, from 1838 to 1859, in Leiden. In 1859, Pluygers succeeded Jacob Geel as the Leiden university librarian, modernized its workings, and continued up to 1879. Collaborating with Dutch architect Jan Willem Schaap, Pluygers studied 17 or 30 foreign European library buildings, such as the Reading Room of the British Museum, before designing the new Leiden university library at Rapenburg, which was completed in 1862, with modern iron stairs and floors. All 40,000 books had to be re-catalogued and relocated by curator P.A. Tiele, an operation completed in 1864. From 1862 to 1879 Pluygers taught classical archeology (Latin and Greek antiquities) at Leiden University.

Pluygers became a member of the Royal Netherlands Academy of Arts and Sciences in 1864, but resigned in 1867.

== Publications ==
=== in Latin ===
- Pluygers, W.G. (1836). Specimen academicum litterarium, continens diatriben de Demade, quod annuente summo numine (in Latin). Hagae comitis (The Hague): Hooff et Socios. OCLC 64886993. Doctoral thesis on Demades, Leiden University, Leiden. 77 pages.
- Pluygers, W.G. (1855). Specimen emendationum in Ciceronis Verrinae actionis secundae libros II et III (in Latin). Lugduni Batavorum (Leiden): Brill. OCLC 869399658.
- Pluygers, W.G. (1859). Observationes criticae in Corn. Taciti libros (in Latin). OCLC 68343266.
- Pluygers, W.G. (1862). Oratio quam habuit Guilelmus Georgius Pluygers a.d. XIX Septembris a. 1862 cum in Academia Lugduno-Batava litterarum humaniorim et philosophae theoreticae professionem ordinariam solemni ritu auspicaretur. Lugduni Batavorum.

=== in Dutch ===
- Madvig, J.N. (1849). Syntaxis der Grieksche taal, hoofdzakelijk voor het Attische taaleigen, voor scholen, (in Dutch). Translated by Pluygers, W.G. Amsterdam: J.C.A. Sulpke.
- Pluygers, W.G., ed. (1868). Leerboek der Grieksche taal, hoofdzakelĳk van het Attische taaleigen, voor scholen (in Dutch) (3rd ed.). Amsterdam. OCLC 67365399.

== Secondary literature ==
- Berkvens-Stevelinck, Christiane (2012). Magna commoditas : Leiden University's great asset : 425 years library collections and services. Translated by UvA Talen, Amsterdam. Leiden: Leiden University Press. pp. 169–171, 173, 175, 187. ISBN 9789087281656. OCLC 794706996.
- Otterspeer, W. (1992). De wiekslag van hun geest. De Leidse universiteit in de negentiende eeuw (in Dutch). Leiden. pp. 142–144.
