= Leiden University Library =

Academic library in the Netherlands

Coordinates: 52°09′27″N 4°28′52″E

Leiden University Libraries
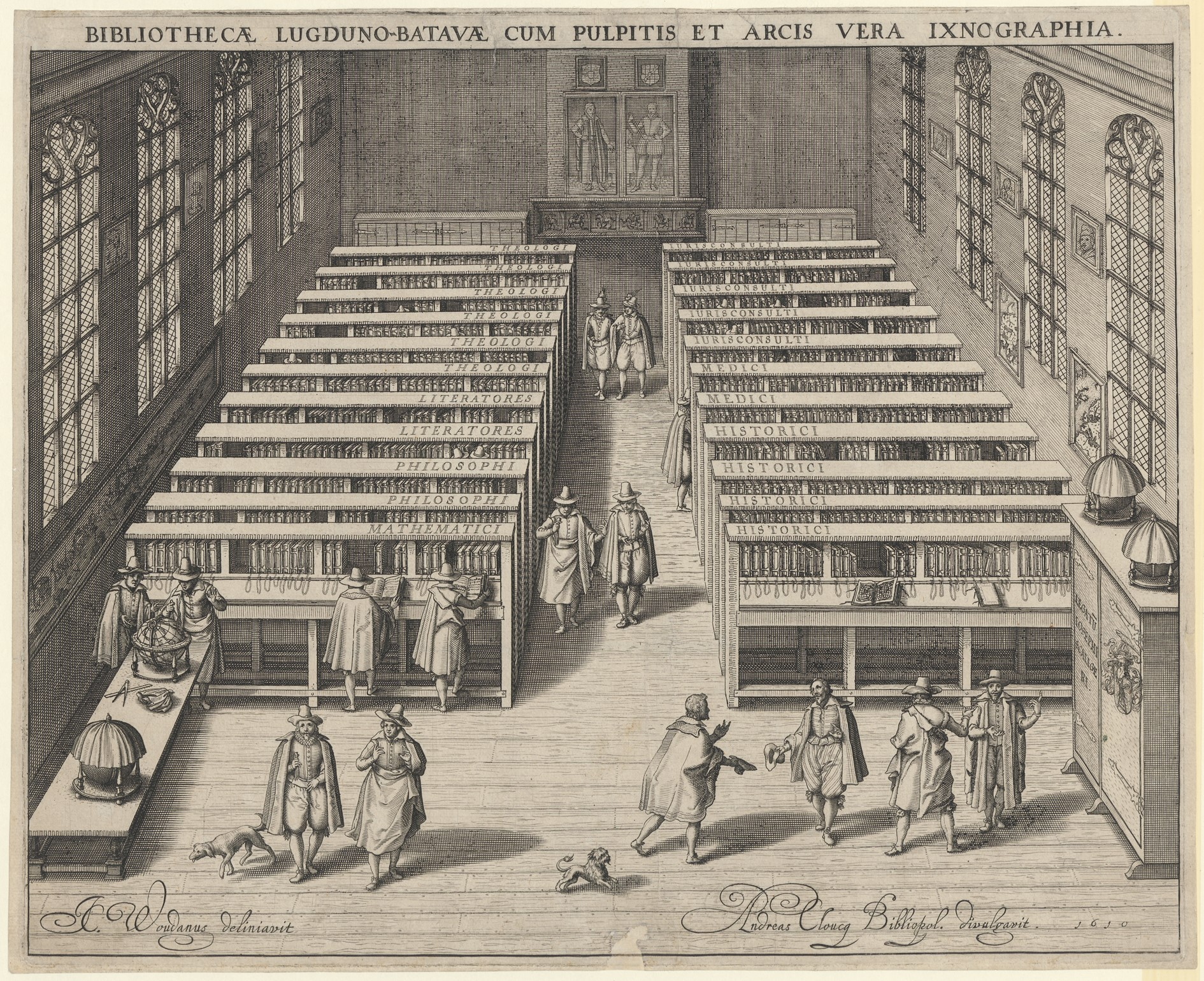
- Library in 1610 (print by Woudanus)
- Location: Leiden, The Netherlands
- Type: Academic library
- Established: 24 May 1575
- Architect: Bart van Kasteel
- Branches: 5

Collection
- Size: 5,200,000 volumes, 1,000,000 e-books, 90,000 e-journals, 2,000 current paper journals, 60,000 Oriental and Western manuscripts, 500,000 letters, 100,000 maps, 100,000 prints, 12,000 drawings, 300,000 photographs, and 3,000 cuneiform tablets.

Other information
- Director: Kurt De Belder
- Website: www.library.universiteitleiden.nl

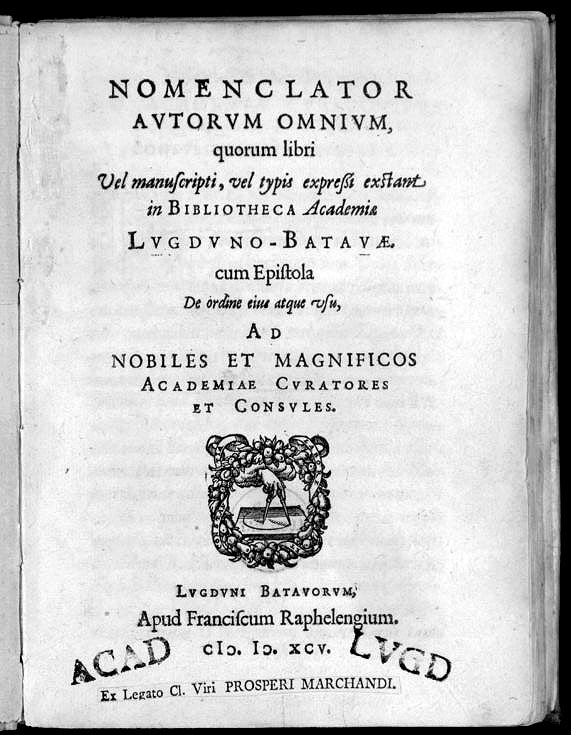
Nomenclator autorum omnium, quorum libri vel manuscripti, vel typis expressi exstant in Bibliotheca Academiae Lugduno-Batavae (List of all authors whose books, whether manuscript or printed, are available in Leiden University Library), Library catalogue, 1595.

Leiden University Libraries is the set of libraries of Leiden University, founded in 1575 in Leiden, Netherlands. Holdings include some five million volumes, one million e-books, ninety thousand e-journals, two thousand current paper journals, and three thousand cuneiform tablets. The library manages large collections on Indonesia and the Caribbean, and curates seven entries in UNESCO's international and Dutch Memory of the World Register. Joseph Justus Scaliger, who was a languages and history professor at Leiden from 1593 up to 1609, commented in Latin on the library:

Est hic magna commoditas bibliothecae ut studiosi possint studere.

Here [at Leiden] is the great convenience of a library so that those who want to study [students], can study.

== History ==
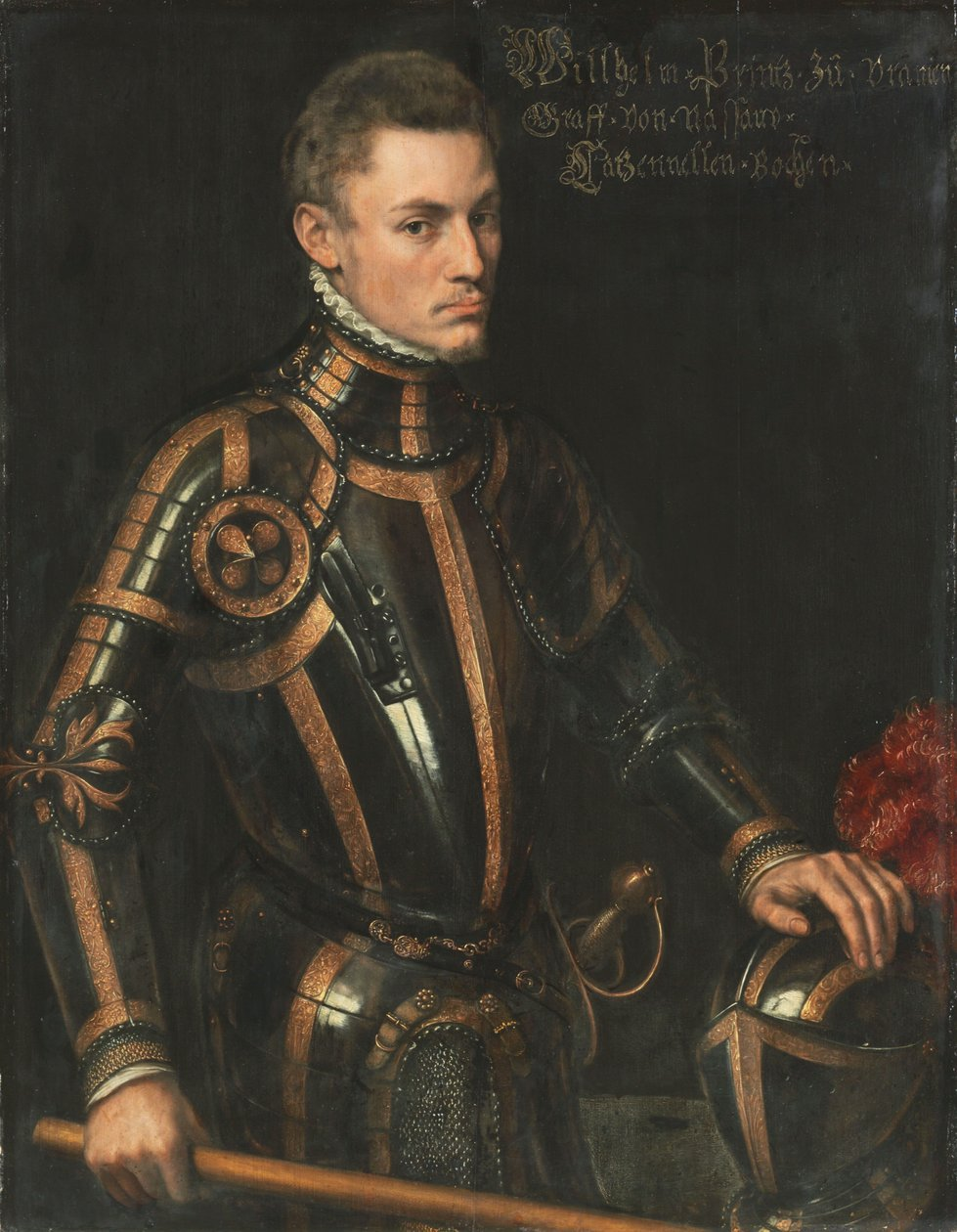
William I, Prince of Orange, main leader of the Dutch revolt against the Spanish, founder of Leiden University, donated the first book to the library, a copy of the Polyglot Bible. Copy of a painting by Antonio Moro, dating from 1555.

The 16th-century Dutch Revolt against the Habsburgs created a new country with a new religion. Soon, the need for a seat of higher learning was felt and in 1575 Leiden University was founded with the spoils from a confiscated Catholic monastery nearby.

At the time the university was founded, it was immediately determined that a library in the vicinity of lecture halls was an absolute necessity. The library's first book was the Polyglot Bible, called the Biblia Regia (Royal Bible, as the university was officially founded in the name of King Philip II of Spain) printed by Christoffel Plantijn and gifted by William of Orange to the library in 1575. The presentation of this book is regarded as the base on which the library is built (Latin: fundamentum locans futurae aliquando bibliothecae, translation: laying the foundation of an eventual future library). The library became operational in the vault of the current Academy building at Rapenburg on 31 October 1587.

In 1595 the Nomenclator appeared, the first catalogue of Leiden University Libraries as well as possibly the first printed catalogue of an institutional library in the world. The publication of the catalogue coincided with the opening of the new library on the upper floor of the Faliede Bagijnkerk (now Rapenburg 70) next to the Theatrum Anatomicum.

In 1864 the copy for the complete alphabetical catalogue of the library in Leiden from 1575 to 1860 was finished; it was never to appear in print. Readers were able to consult alphabetical and systematic registers of the Leiden library in the form of bound catalogue cards, known as Leidse boekjes (Leiden booklets). This remained the cataloguing system for the library until 1988.

The 22nd Librarian of Leiden University, Johan Remmet de Groot took the initiative for the Dutch library automation endeavor PICA (Project Integrated Catalogue Automation). Pica was started up in 1969 and was bought by OCLC in 2000. The first automation project in Leiden started in 1976, produced 400,000 titles via the Dutch PICA-GGC and resulted within a few years in a catalog on microfiche, which partly replaced the famous Leiden booklets catalogue.

In 1983 the library moved to its present location on Witte Singel in a new building by architect Bart van Kasteel. The first online catalogue became available in 1988.

== Leiden University Libraries today ==
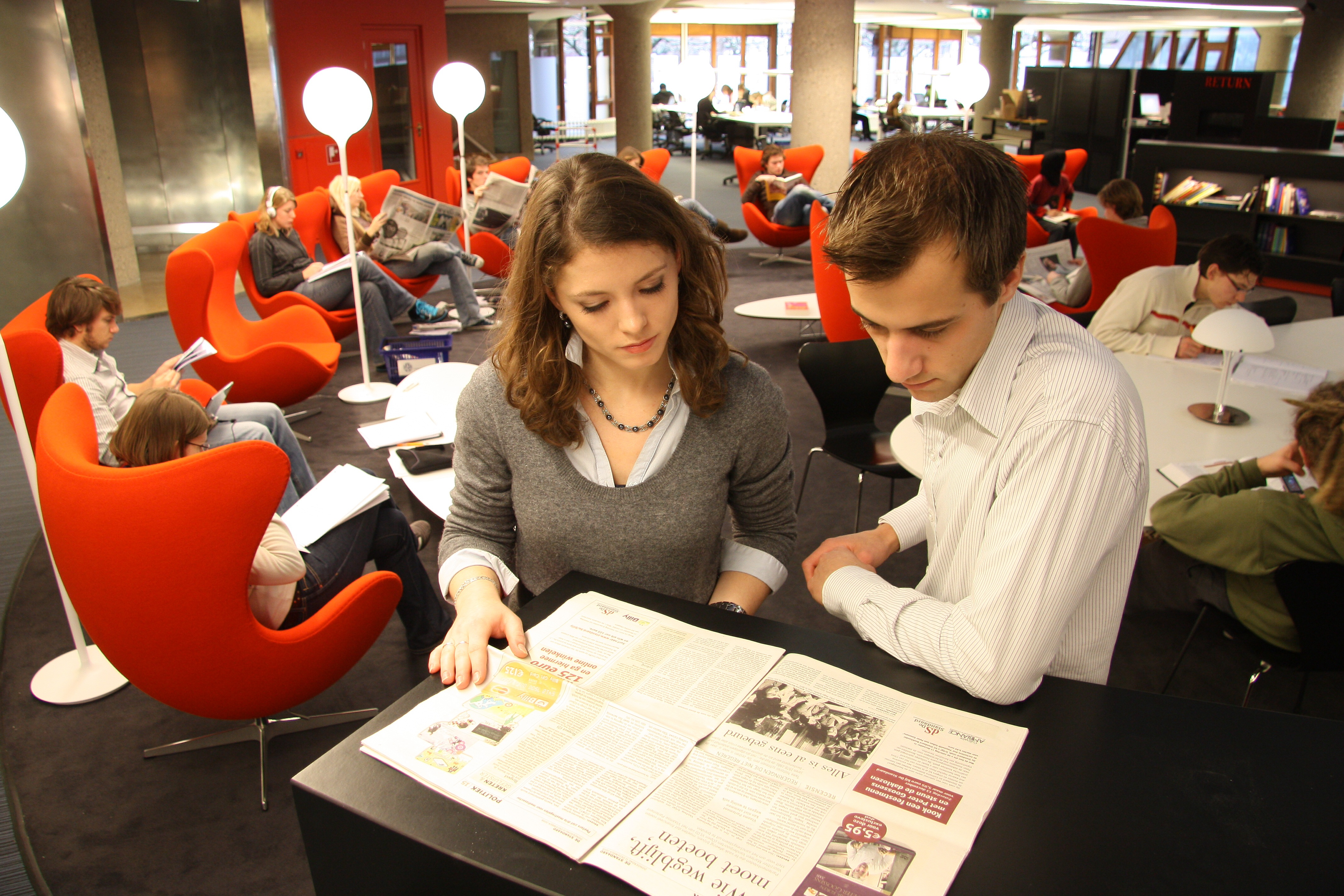
Leiden University Libraries, Information Centre Huygens, 2014.

The library facilitates access to published information and supports the evaluation, use, production and dissemination of scholarly information. To accomplish this the library's activities range from supporting education in information literacy to serving as an expert center for digital publishing. The library aims to function as the scholarly information manager of Leiden University. The strategic plan Partner in Kennis 2011–2015 (Partner in Knowledge 2011–2015) focused on the transformation of the library to an expert centre supporting research and education in digital spaces through Virtual Research Environments and Datalabs, the realization of library learning centres, the development of new expert areas such as data curation and text & data mining, and on digital information skills.

Leiden's Catalogue makes available more than 400 databases, >70,000 e-journals, >5,000 newspapers and newsmagazines, >1,000,000 e-books and reference works, many hundreds of millions of journal articles, its digital special collections and repository materials.

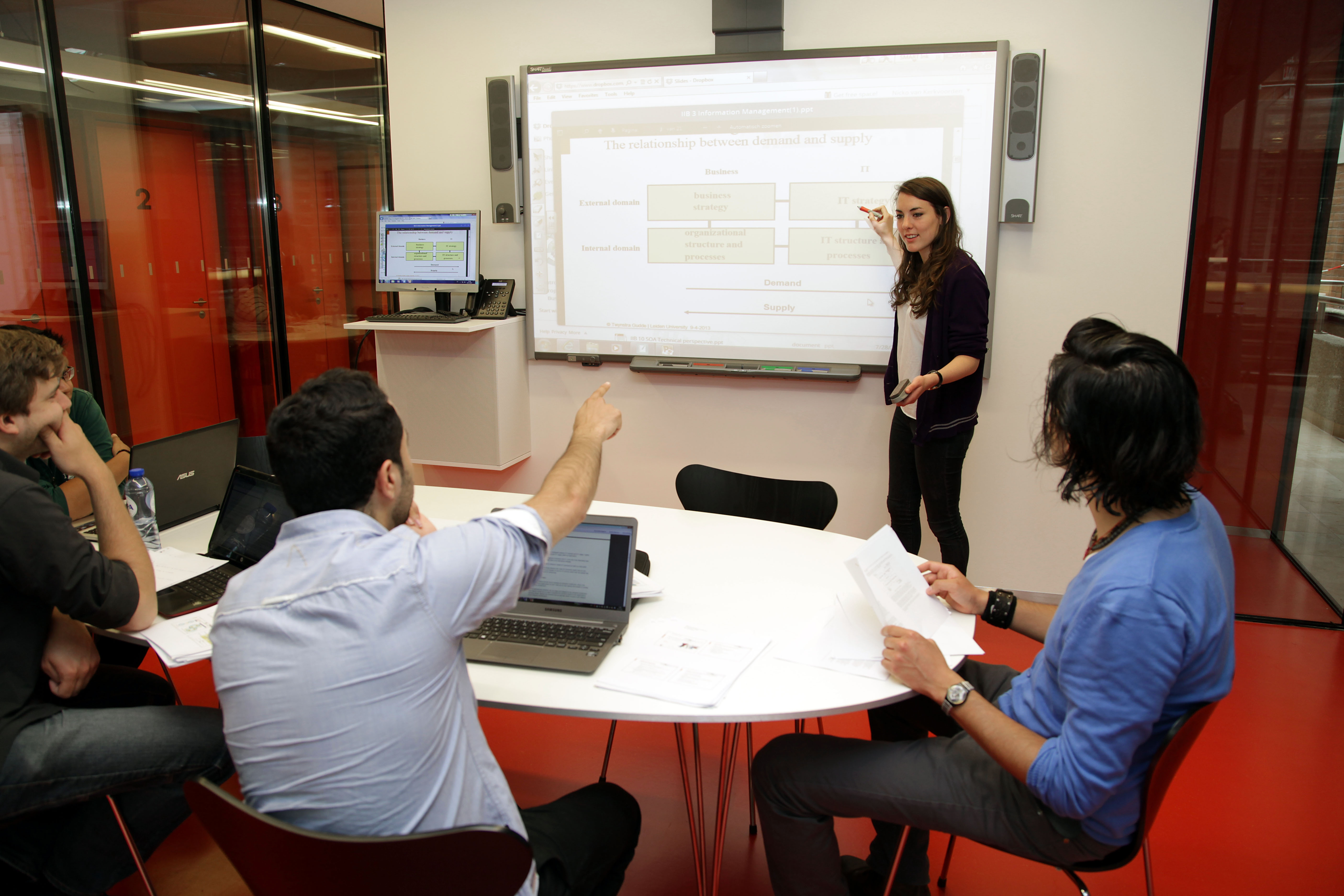
Leiden University Libraries, Group Study Room, 2014.

The special collections and archives of Leiden University (see below) are accessible through the library's Catalogue and Digital Collections environment.

The library supports researchers from Leiden University through its Centre for Digital Scholarship which focuses on open access, copyright, data management, text and data mining and virtual research environments.

The library makes all doctoral dissertations available online through the Catalogue and Leiden University Scholarly Publications that functions according to the open access principles. Furthermore, publications from Leiden researchers are made available through the same repository. Thanks to the use of international standards, including the Open Archives Initiative, the repository is visited daily by general and specialized search engines that harvest and index this information.

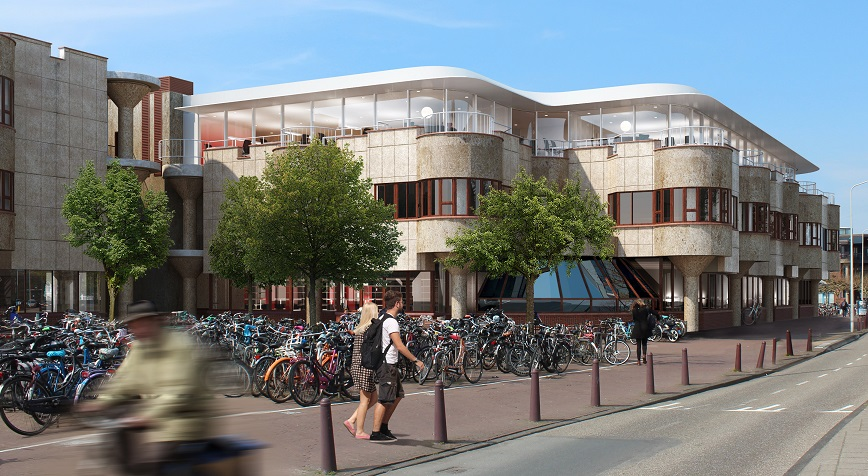
Simulated visualisation of the Asian Library at Leiden University, 2016.

In 2007, the library started the renovation of its facilities: wireless access became available throughout the library in December 2007, in March 2008 the completely renovated Special Collections Reading Room Dousa was reopened, in June 2008 the fire protection systems installed in the closed stacks and the vaults of the library were taken into use, in December 2008 library patrons were able to make use of the new facilities created in the renovated Information Centre Huygens, and a new exhibition space was opened on 25 March 2010, in the direct vicinity of a completely renovated entrance. In 2012–2013 the study areas (the complete first floor and parts of the second floor) of the University Library were renovated and a media centre was opened.

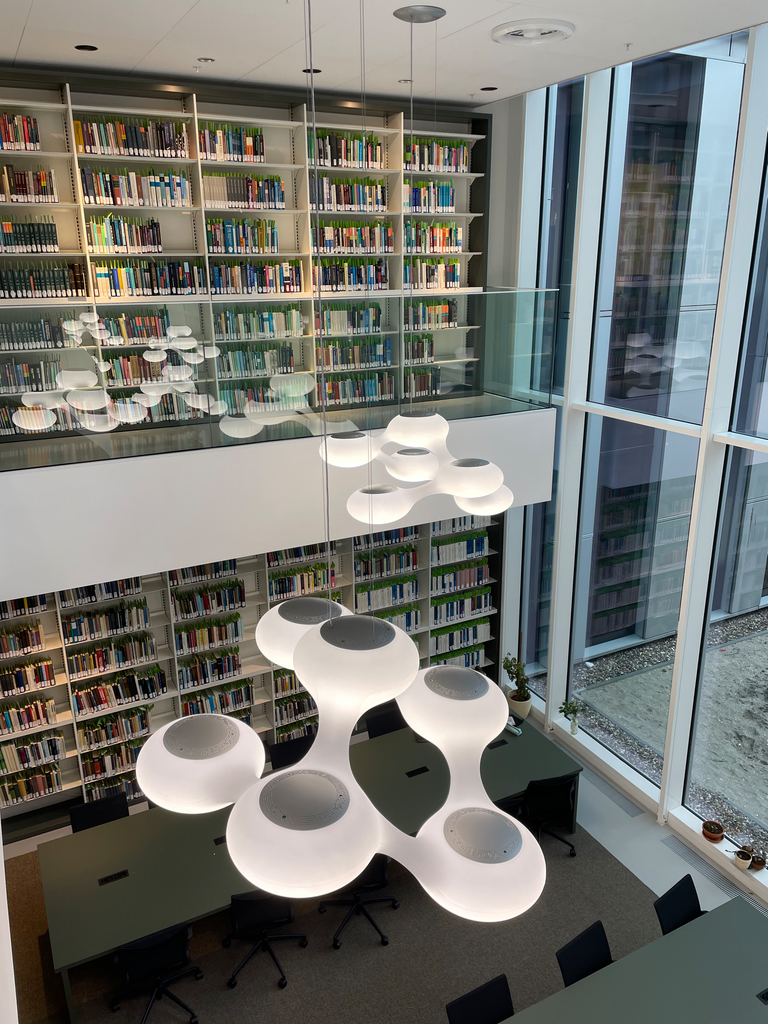
Science Library, Gorlaeus Building. Leiden University Libraries, 2024.

Since 1 June 2009, the Leiden libraries form one organization: Leiden University Libraries (UBL). Leiden University Libraries has a number of locations: the University Library, the libraries of Social and Behavioral Sciences, Law, Mathematics and Natural Sciences and the East Asian Library. The collections of the former Archeology, Art History and Kern libraries are available at the University Library. On 3 September 2012, a Library Learning Centre was opened on the university's The Hague campus.

Leiden University Libraries took over in 2013 the colonial collections including the entire map collections (colonial and modern) of the Royal Tropical Institute (KIT) and in 2014 the complete collection of the Royal Netherlands Institute of Southeast Asian and Caribbean Studies (KITLV). By bringing these collections together with those of the university libraries, the largest Indonesian and Caribbean collections worldwide were created. Furthermore, Leiden University Libraries took over the KITLV-Jakarta office where extensive paper and digital collections on modern Indonesia are collected and cataloged. To house its world-famous and vast Asian collections a number of new facilities have been created: an open stack area making 5 km of materials directly available and a new remote storage facility housing 38 km of library materials. On 14 September 2017, Queen Máxima opened The Asian Library, a new floor on top of the University Library.

In 2017, the Academic Historical Museum became part of UBL. The library of The Netherlands Institute for the Near East, specialised in the fields of Assyriology, Egyptology and Near Eastern Archaeology, became part of UBL in 2018. In 2021, the Walaeus Library of the Leiden University Medical Center joined UBL.

In 2024 a new Science Library, African Library and Middle Eastern Library were opened.

Leiden University Libraries works together with other organizations nationally and internationally on innovation projects in this area. The library e.g. participated in the DAREnet project and in projects financed by the European Union such as DRIVER-II, OAPEN, PAGODE and ARMA.

== Special Collections ==
Leiden University Libraries hold a large number of special collections of national and international importance. These include manuscripts, early printed books, maps, atlases, prints, drawings, and photographs. To make these collections visible for a broad audience, the library partnered in 2015 with De Boekenwereld, a richly illustrated magazine in Dutch for lovers of books with information about the early and modern book and graphic art.

=== Western Manuscripts ===
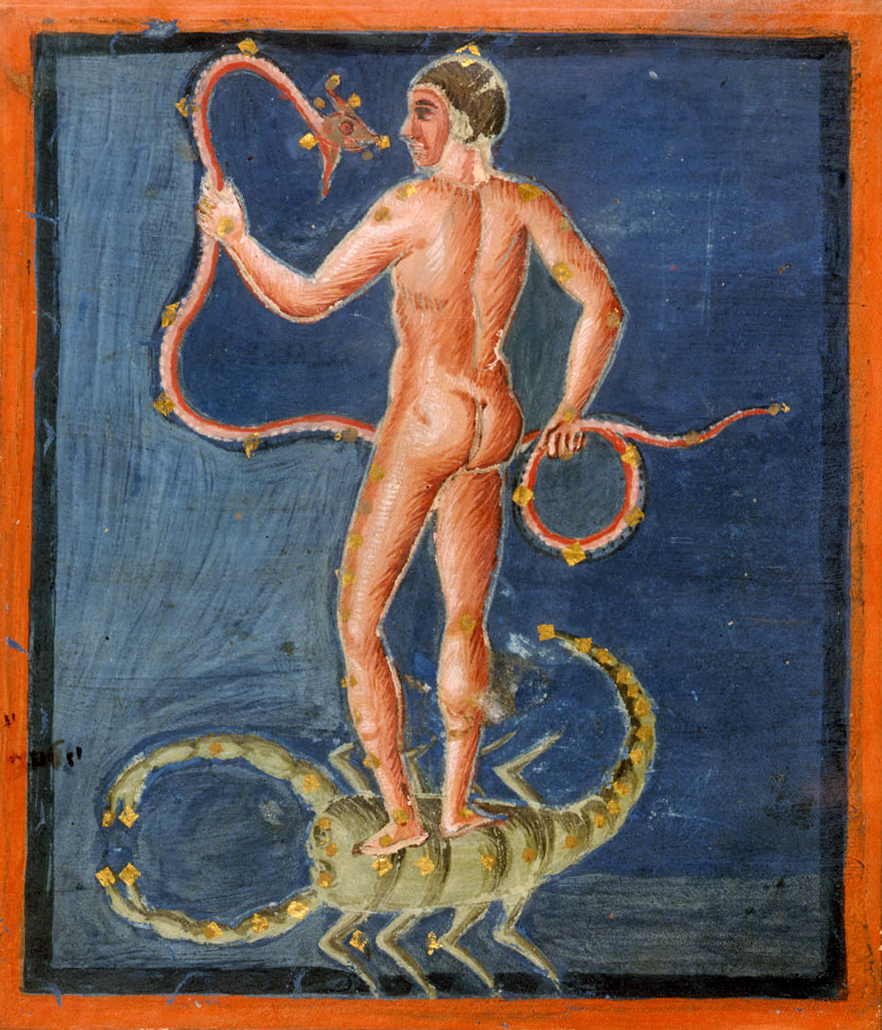
A page of the Leiden Aratea manuscript illustrates the constellations Ophiuchus, Serpens and Scorpius. Around 816.

The collection Western Manuscripts contains all western manuscripts (including some twenty nine hundred medieval manuscripts and fragments and twenty five thousand modern manuscripts), three hundred thousand letters, archives and three thousand annotated prints of the University Library, including the archives of the university.

The collection of medieval manuscripts "is one of the oldest and largest in the Benelux. In fact, there are only ten libraries worldwide that have over a hundred manuscripts from the ninth century, and Leiden is one of them." Among others, it includes the Bibliotheca Vossiana which holds the manuscript collections of Isaac Vossius. The codicies are mainly written in Greek and Latin and contain some of the earliest surviving classical literature, such as the Leiden Pliny.

=== Western Printed Works ===
The collection Western Printed Works contains materials printed before 1801 (including 700 incunabula) and rare and precious works from after 1801. In the course of four centuries the collection has been expanded through bequests, gifts and acquisitions of collections from scholars. Furthermore, the University Library obtained the deposit right for a copy of each book for which the States of Holland had given the privilege to print. The collection also includes more than 100,000 printed works from the library of the Maatschappij der Nederlandse Letterkunde which has been deposited on permanent loan since 1876.

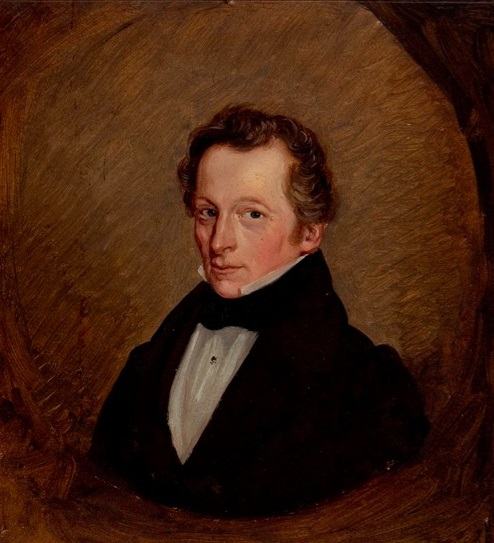
J.L. Cornet (1815–1882): Portrait of J.T. Bodel Nijenhuis. Collection Leiden University Libraries.

=== Bodel Nijenhuis Collection ===
The Bodel Nijenhuis Collection contains mainly old maps, atlases, topographical prints and drawings. Most of the collection was obtained as a bequest from J.T. Bodel Nijenhuis. The lawyer Johannes Tiberius Bodel Nijenhuis (1797–1872), director of the publishing house Luchtmans, for 25 years a member of the Maatschappij der Nederlandse Letterkunde, was a passionate collector of cartographical and topographical material.

The collection contains 60,000 maps (of which 3,000 drawings), 1,500 atlases, 24,000 topographical prints, 1,600 drawings and the archive of Youssouf Kamal's Monumenta Cartographica Africae et Aegypti.

=== Oriental Collections ===
From its very onset the study of the Orient was of vital importance to the new university. Theologians studied the Semitic languages to perceive the meaning of the Bible. Political and commercial interests prompted the new-born Dutch Republic to establish relations with its enemies' enemies, among whom the Ottoman Empire, then at the zenith of its power. In the course of its expansionist policy the Dutch Republic secured possession of the Indonesian archipelago and other territories in South East Asia. In Japan, Dutch merchants maintained a trading post to the exclusion of all other European powers.

In the course of four centuries countless manuscripts, printed books and photographs on the Orient and Oriental Studies have found their way to the library of Leiden University. Oriental Studies are still flourishing at Leiden University, and the Oriental Collections are still growing to serve the needs of the national and international scholarly community.

The Oriental Collections of Leiden University Libraries are known as the Legatum Warnerianum (Warner's Legacy), referring to Levinus Warner (1619–1665), envoy to the Sublime Porte at Constantinople, whose collection of 1,000 Middle Eastern manuscripts forms the core of the present-day Oriental Collections. In 1659 following the death of the Ottoman bibliophile-encyclopedist Kâtip Çelebi his library was sold. At the time it was the largest private library in Istanbul, and Warner acquired part of it for the University of Leiden.

The Oriental Collections nowadays contain 30,000 manuscripts and 200,000 printed books on subjects ranging from Archaeology to Zoroastrianism and in languages from Arabic to Zulu.

=== Bibliotheca Thysiana ===
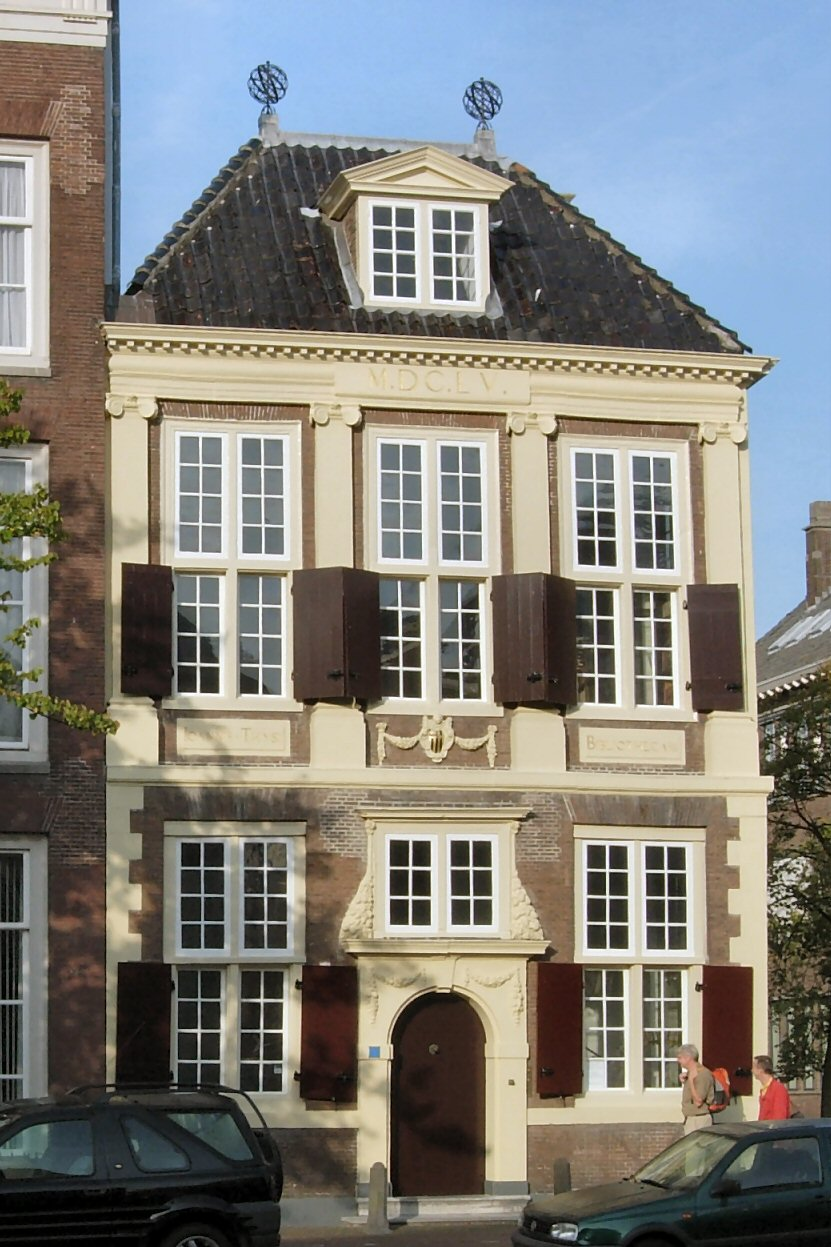
Bibliotheca Thysiana, Rapenburg 25, Leiden, 2006.

The Bibliotheca Thysiana was erected in 1655 to house the book collection of the lawyer Joannes Thysius (1622–1653). Upon his early death, he left a legacy of 20,000 guilders for the building of a public library ("tot publycque dienst der studie") with a custodian's dwelling. Designed by the architect Arent van 's-Gravensande, the building follows the Dutch Classical style and is regarded as one of the jewels of Dutch 17th century architecture. It is distinguished by its balanced proportions and the purity of its Ionic order on top of a high basement.

The Bibliotheca Thysiana is the only surviving 17th century example in the Netherlands of a building that was designed as a library. It is unusual that a complete private 17th century library has been preserved and thus offers a good impression of the book collection of a young, learned bibliophile from the period of late Humanism. The collection contains about 2,500 books and thousands of pamphlets in all scientific fields.

=== Maatschappij der Nederlandse Letterkunde ===
Otherwise known as the MNL, the "Maatschappij der Nederlandse Letterkunde" (Dutch Society of Letters) was founded in Leiden in 1766 to promote the study of Dutch historical linguistic subjects. This society joined the Leiden University Libraries in 1876, and since 1999 forms the basis of the DBNL – the digital online library of the Dutch Language, an initiative for an online open access archive of the greatest works in Dutch literary history. The society had regular meetings in Leiden on literary subjects, but also on scientific subjects. It became fashionable for the elite to become members, and many were also members of the Dutch Society of Science (Koninklijke Hollandsche Maatschappij der Wetenschappen), a similar society for the study of scientific subjects founded in Haarlem in 1752. Both societies still hold contests and award prizes for achievement.

=== Print Room ===
Founded in 1822, the Print Room possesses art works from the sixteenth century until the present day. Whether you are interested in mythological scenes from the Italian Renaissance, daguerreotypes, the largest collection of portraits in the Netherlands, stereophotography or Dutch landscapes by Rembrandt and his pupils, the Print Room has them. The holdings presently amount to some 12,000 drawings, around 100,000 prints and some 80,000 photographs, with an emphasis on Dutch art. Amongst the drawings and prints you will find works by famous Dutch artists like Goltzius, Visscher, Rembrandt, Troost, Maris, Toorop, and Veldhoen, but prominent artists from other European Schools, like Hogarth, Callot, Canaletto, and Dürer are also present with specimens up to 1900. The photography collection spreads from its earliest history to the present day and boasts examples of virtually every Dutch photographer, from anonymous nineteenth-century pioneers through Piet Zwart and Paul Citroen to Ed van der Elsken and Johan van der Keuken, including a lot of attention to present day photographers such as Erwin Olaf and Hendrik Kerstens.

=== Colonial Collection (KIT) ===
The collection was started in 1864 with the opening of the Colonial Museum in Haarlem, but parts date back to the predecessor of the museum: the department of 'Trade and Colonies' founded in 1777 and part of the Hollandsche Maatschappij van Wetenschappen. In 1913 the collection was taken over by the Colonial Institute in Amsterdam founded in 1910. In 1950, after the Dutch decolonization, the mission of the Colonial Institute changed which was reflected in a name change to Royal Tropical Institute. But also the development of the collection changed quite drastically. In 2013 the library of the Royal Tropical Institute was closed and the part of the collection that dealt with the former Dutch colonies was housed at Leiden University Libraries.

=== Collection of the Royal Netherlands Institute of Southeast Asian and Caribbean Studies (KITLV) ===
The KITLV was founded in 1851 and created the foremost collections on Southeast Asia (especially on Indonesia) and the Caribbean (especially Suriname, Aruba and the Netherlands Antilles). The collection contains about 1 million – mostly postcolonial – books and special collections, including 150.000 digitized historical photographs, maps, prints and unique archives.

On 1 July 2014, the management of the collection was transferred from the Royal Netherlands Academy of Arts and Sciences to Leiden University Libraries.

=== De Liagre Böhl collection ===
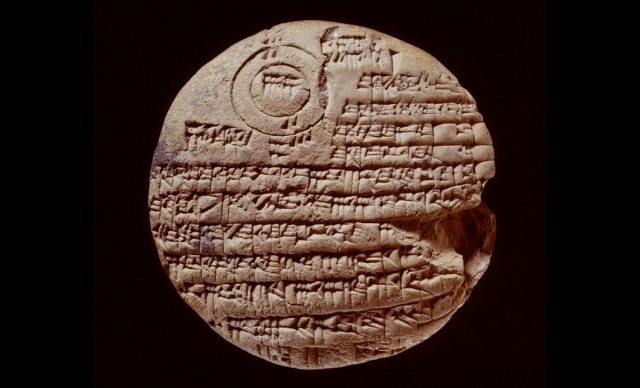
Cuneiform tablet in Old-Babylonian: illustrated math problem. What is the length of the circular city wall after enlargement? Clay, Lagaba (southern Iraq), ca. 1700 BC. De Liagre Böhl Collection. Photo 2024.

This De Liagre Böhl or Böhl Collection includes 3,000 cuneiform tablets of Sumerian and Babylonian/Assyrian origin, the largest collection of its kind in The Netherlands. The collection was brought together in the 1920s and '30s by F.M.Th. de Liagre Böhl, Professor of Assyriology at Leiden University and co-director of NINO 1939–1955. Diverse text genres are present in the tablet collection: literary texts, omens, incantations, archival texts etc. In addition to the tablets, the collection includes a smaller number of seals, bullae, terracottas and other objects. In 2024 the collection was moved from NINO to Leiden University Library.

=== Scaliger Institute ===
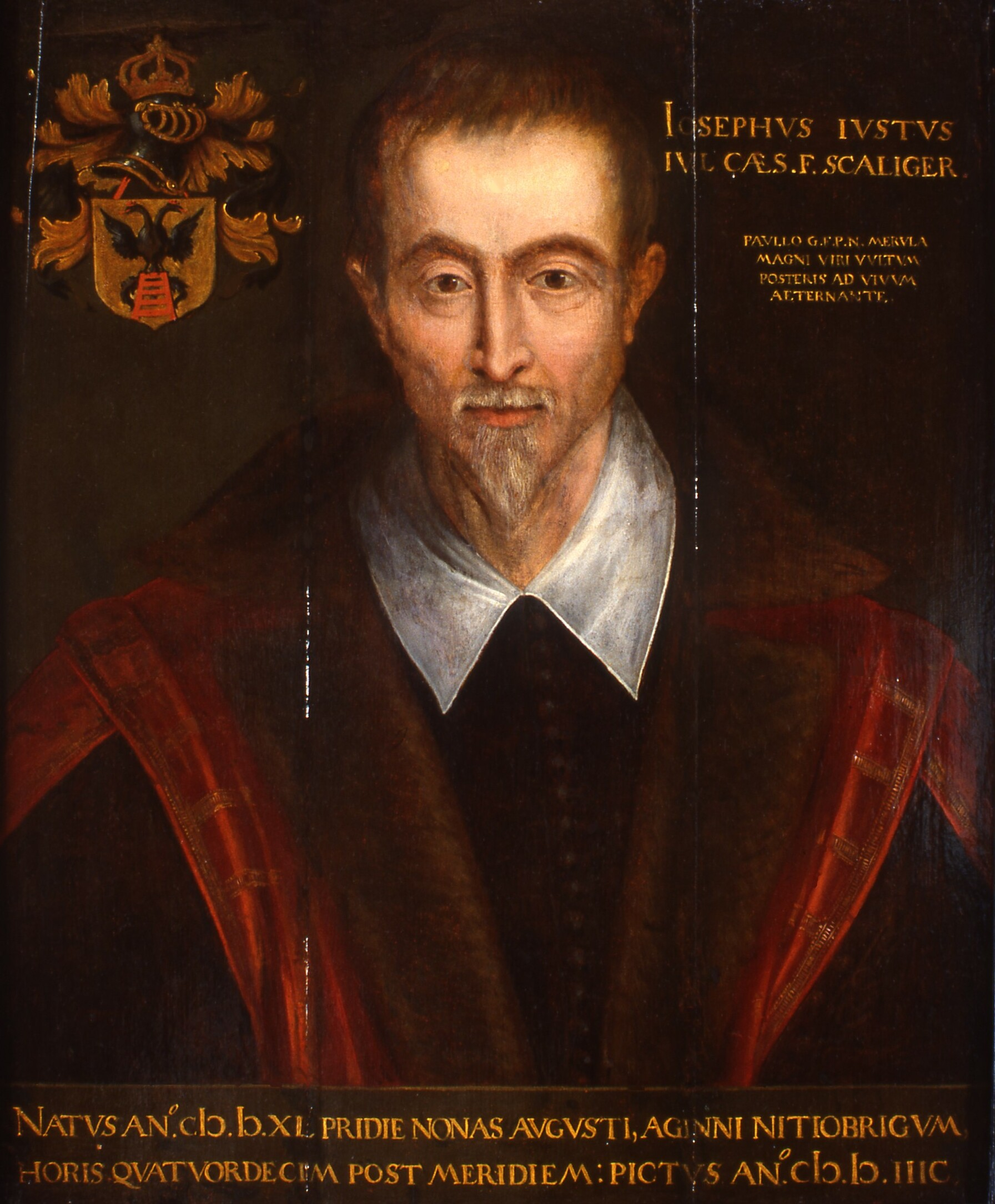
Paulus Merula: Joseph Justus Scaliger, 1597. Merula was the third Librarian of Leiden University (1597–1607).

The Scaliger Institute, founded in 2000, aims to stimulate and facilitate the use of the special collections in both teaching and research. For this purpose, the institute offers favourable working conditions and expertise, organizes lectures, symposia, master classes, and special courses, and provides fellowships to junior and senior scholars from the Netherlands and elsewhere who wish to work in Leiden for a longer period. These include the Brill, Elsevier, Lingling Wiyadharma, Van de Sande, Juynboll en Ailion fellowships, which focus on different disciplines or regions.

The Scaliger Chair (Scaliger Professor), affiliated with both the Institute at Leiden University Libraries and the university's Faculty of Humanities, is tasked with "promot[ing] teaching and research relating to the Special Collections held by the University library" through outreach activities directed towards academic and non-academic audiences.

Scaliger professors:

- Wim Gerritsen (2002–2006)
- Harm Beukers (2007–2016)
- Erik Kwakkel (2016–2018)
- Rick Honings (2020–present)

Furthermore, an internationally prominent scholar is frequently appointed as 'Visiting Scaliger Professor' who delivers the Scaliger Lecture: Anthony Grafton (2009), François Déroche (2010), Peter Frankopan (2017), and Ted Underwood (2019). The institute was named after Josephus Justus Scaliger (1540–1609), Leiden's most renowned scholar during the early years of its existence and a great benefactor of the University Library through the donation, at his death, of his exceptional collection of manuscripts and all his oriental books.

=== Specific information ===
- Areas of concentration: archaeology, anthropology, art, astronomy, cartography, classics, education, history, law, literature, medicine, Orientalism, papyrology, philosophy, politics, publishing, religion, science.
- Some individual collections: Emmy Andriesse, D. Bierens de Haan, Willem Bilderdijk, T. Bodel Nijenhuis, G.J.P.J Bolland, J. Golius, Robert van Gulik, A.P.H. Hotz, J. Huizinga, Constantijn and Christiaan Huygens, Frans Kellendonk, Justus Lipsius, Prosper Marchand, Eduard Meijers, K.H. Miskotte, Jan Oort, Valery Pereleshin, Menno Rijke, Joseph Scaliger, C. Snouck Hourgronje, Cornelis Tiele, Herman Neubronner van der Tuuk, Isaac Vossius, Levinus Warner, Nicolaas van Wijk, Jan Wolkers.
- Some institutional collections: Bohn Publishers, Sijthoff Publishers, Bibliothèque Wallonne, NHK (Dutch Reformed Church), Seminarium Remonstrantum, photographs Indonesia, ISIM (Islam), Zaken Overzee (Netherlands Ministry of Overseas Affairs), Leiden Observatory.

== Documents inscribed in the UNESCO Memory of the World Register ==
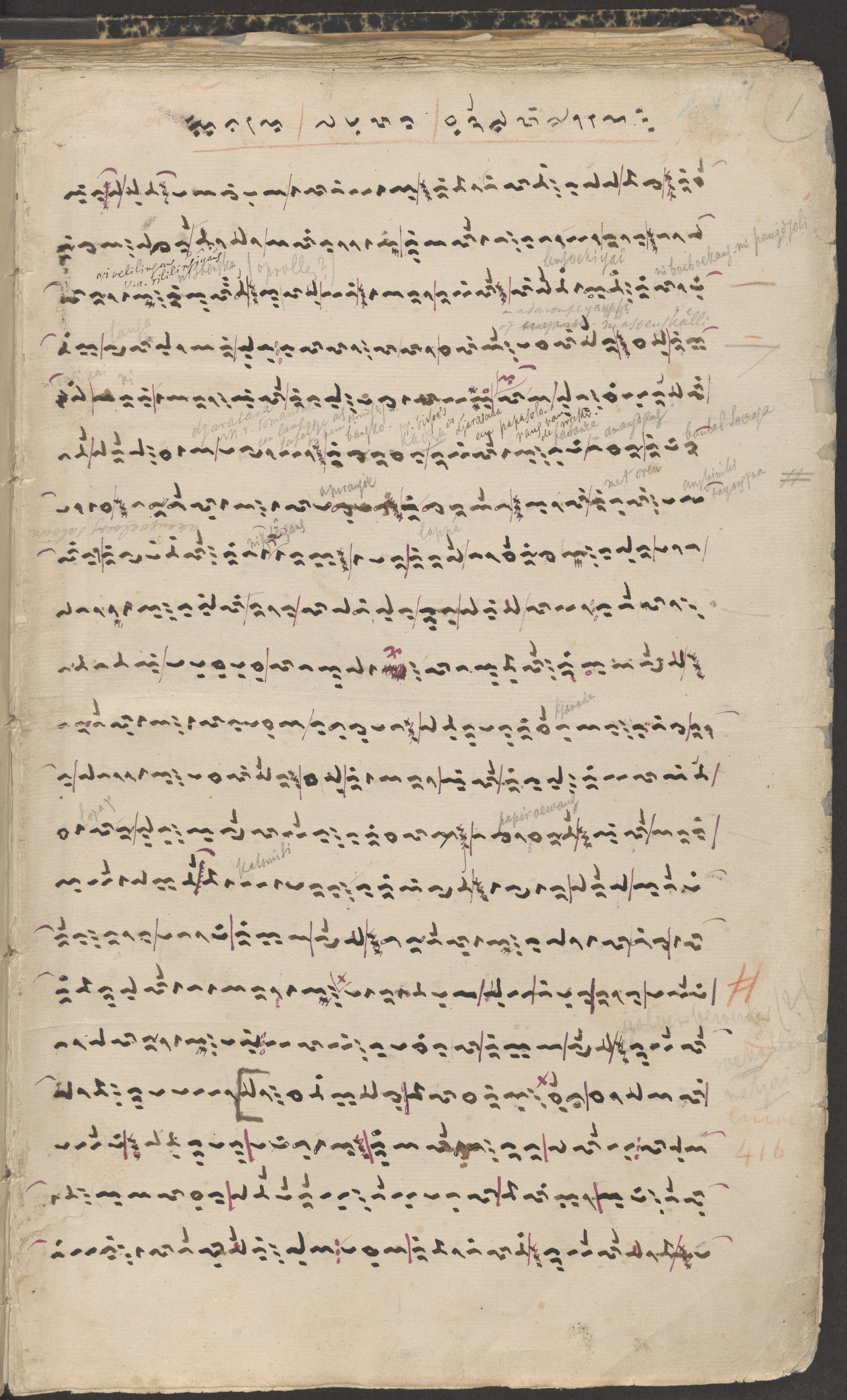
La Galigo, a Sulawesi 18th – 20th century creation myth. Page from the Leiden Manuscript.

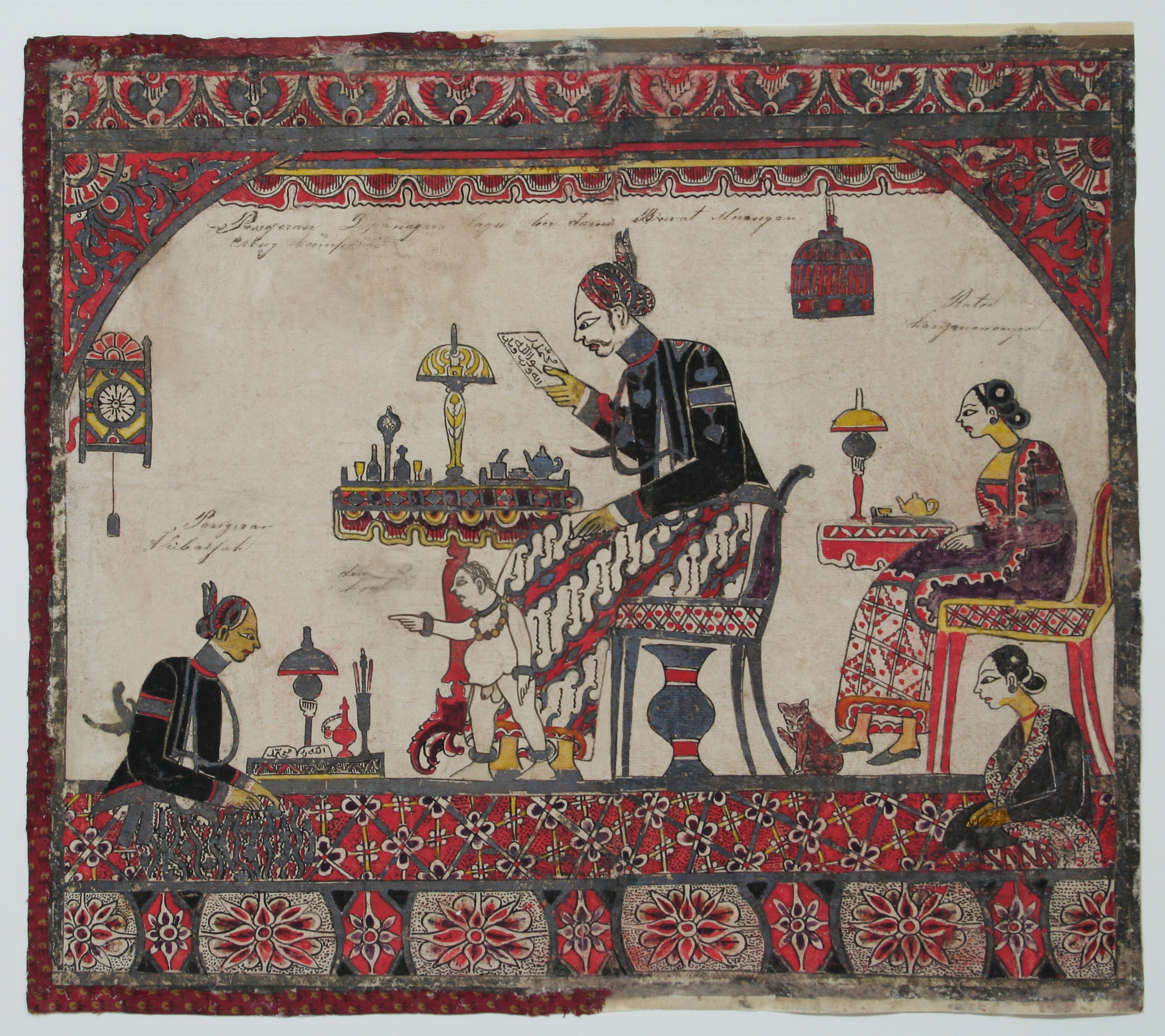
Javanese colonial rebel prince Diponegoro reading an Islamic mystical tasawuf text in exile in Makasar, 1833–1855. Babad Diponegoro manuscript, Leiden University Libraries.

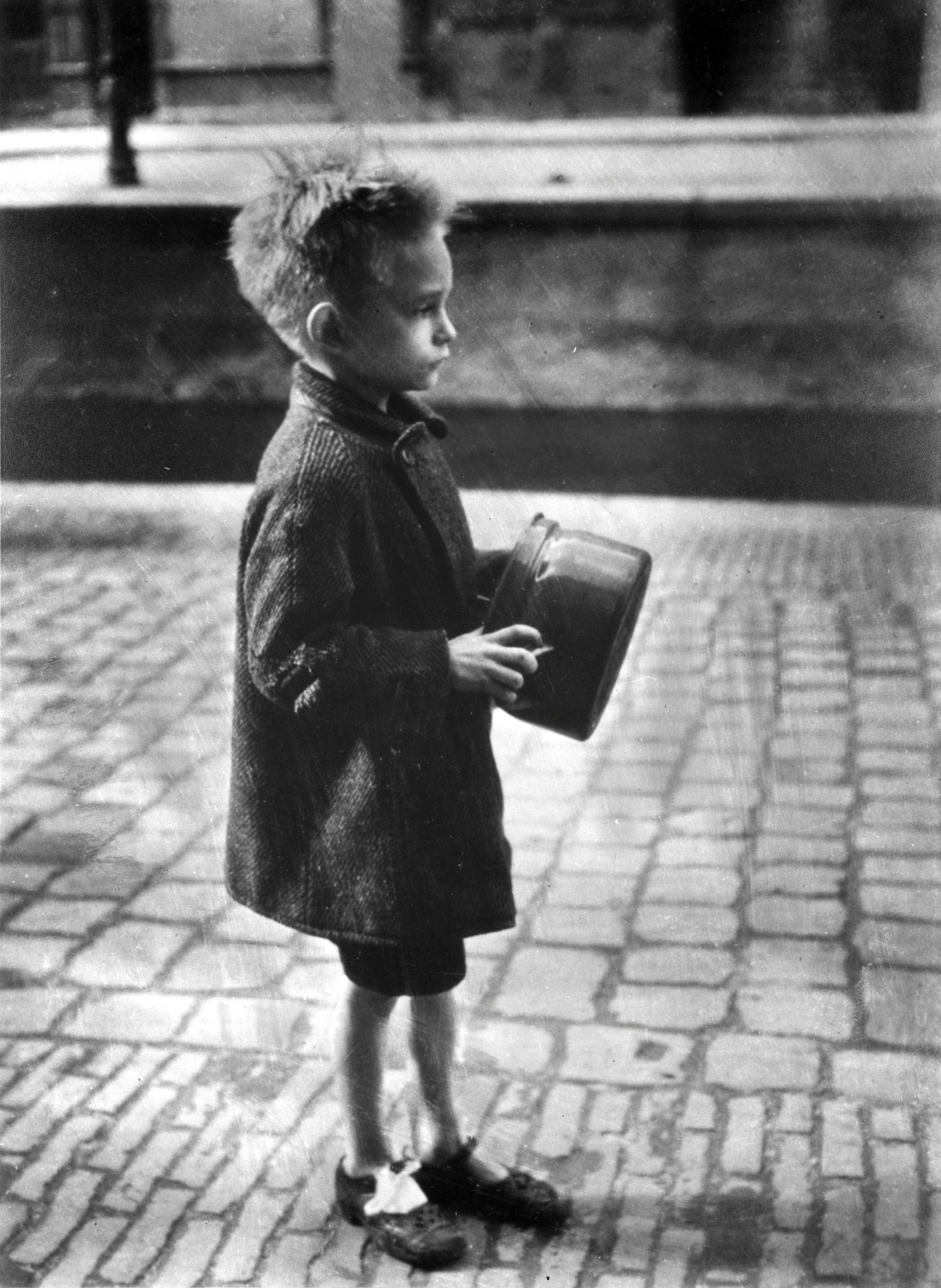
Emmy Andriesse: photograph of a boy with a pan during the Hunger Winter (1944–1945) in Amsterdam. From Leiden University Libraries.

In the prestigious UNESCO Memory of the World Register documents are inscribed that affirm their world significance and outstanding universal value. For the Netherlands from Leiden University Library the following entries are inscribed:

=== International Memory of the World Register ===
- The Leiden La Galigo manuscript, written in Buginese (inscribed on 25 May 2011). From the NBG collection. NBG-Boeg 188.
- Babad Diponegoro, the Dutch translation of the autobiographical manuscript of the Javanese prince Diponegoro (1755 -1855), national hero and pan-Islamist (18 June 2013). From the KITLV collection. D H 589 a.
- The Panji manuscripts with ancient tales revolving around the mythical Javanese prince Panji (30 October 2017).
- Voyage of circumnavigation by Ferdinand Magellan: Viagem de Fernao de Magalhaes, secundum narrationem cuiusdam socii et suppletus ex aliis fontibus, lusitanice (18 May 2023). VLF 41.
- Hikayat Aceh manuscripts (18 May 2023), manuscript Or. 1954 and Or. 1983.
- Kartini Letters and Archive (11 April 2025). From the KITLV-collection.

=== Dutch Memory of the World Register ===
- De Ondergedoken Camera ("The Underground Camera", 17 April 2025). The photographs from a group of Amsterdam photographers who carried out resistance work during World War II by documenting the German occupation of the Netherlands. Includes photographs by Emmy Andriesse.

== Treasures in the Leiden collections ==
- Pliny the Elder, Natural History (Pliny) or 'Leiden Pliny', MS VLF 4, first half 8th century.
- 'Leyden Manuscript'. Fragment (Latin, Breton/Cornish): Medical recipes, MS VLF 96 A, late 8th century/9th century.
- 'Leiden Glossary'. MS VLQ 69, 800.
- 'Leiden Aratea'. Aratus, Phaenomena interprete Claudio Germanico Caesare, MS VLQ 79, 813–840.
- Lucretius, De rerum natura, MS VLF 30, 825.
- Lucretius, De rerum natura, MS VLQ 94, first half 9th century.
- Cicero, Opera philosophica – MS VLF 84, second quarter 9th century.
- Cicero, Opera philosophica – MS VLF 86, 9th century.
- 'Anonymus Leidensis', De situ orbis, MS VLF 113 p. II, 850–875.
- Composite manuscript, two parts (Latin): 1. (ff. 1r-65v) Old Testament: 1 Maccabees, and other text(s). – 2. (ff. 150–211) Index and vocabulary on Vegetius' Epitoma rei militaris, and other text(s), MS PER F 17, 10th century.
- Ibn Hazm, Ṭawq al-ḥamāma fī 'al-ulfa wa-al-ullīf, MS Or. 927, 1002.
- Liber manualis or notebooks of Ademar of Chabannes, MS VLO 15, 1023–1025.
- 'Leiden Dioscorides'. Dioscorides, Kitāb al-Ḥašāʾiš fī hāyūlā al-ʿilāg ̌al-ṭibbī, MS Or. 289, 1083.
- 'Leiden Willeram, MS BPL 130, 1090–1110?.
- 'Saint Louis Psalter', MS BPL 76 A, 1190.
- Abu Ishaq Ibrahim ibn Muhahammad al-Farisi al-Istakhri, مختصر كتاب المسالك والممالك لابي اسحاق ابراهيم بن محمد الاصطخري / World map in a summary of Kitab al-masalik wa'l mamalik, MS Or. 3101, 1193.
- Rashi, Peirush, MS Or. 4718, 13th century.
- 'Leiden Jerusalem Talmud', MS Or. 4720, 1289.
- Roman van Ferguut, MS LTK 191, c. 1325.
- Vincent of Beauvais, Miroir historial, MS VGG F 3 A, 1332–1335.
- Diederic van Assenede, Floris and Blancheflour, MS LTK 191, 1325–1350.
- Penninc en Pieter Vostaert, Roman van Walewein, MS LTK 195, 1350.
- Heinric van Aken, Roman van Heinric ende Margriete van Limborch, MS LTK 195, 1350.
- Jacob van Maerlant Der naturen bloeme, MS BPL 14 A, 1366?.
- Esopet, MS LTK 191, c. 1350.
- Wirnt von Gravenberg, Wigalois, MS LTK 537, 1372.
- Shahnama, MS Or. 494, 1437.
- Jan Gossaert, The Spinario, PK-T-AW-1041, 15??-1532.
- Pseudo-Albertus Magnus, Alchemical miscellany (German, Latin): De lapidibus and other text(s), MS VCF 29, 1522–1566.
- Melchior Lorck, Prospect of Constantinople, BPL 1758, 1559.
- Zakariya al-Qazwini, Aja'ib al-Makhluqat, MS Or. 8907, 1602.
- Rembrandt, Adam and Eve (Study for Bartsch 28), PK-T-AW-1097, 1638.
- Willem Piso, Georg Marcgraf and Johannes de Laet, Historia Naturalis Brasiliae, 1407 B 3, 1648.
- Christiaan Huygens, Scientific archive 'Codices Hugeniani', 17th century.
- Georg Eberhard Rumphius, Amboinsch Kruidboek, MS BPL 314, 1692–1701.
- Willem Bilderdijk. Collection and Archive, 1770-1831.
- Nicolaas Beets, Archive, 19th century.
- Raden Adjeng Kartini, Kartini Letters, 1900–1926.
- Frank Scholten, Travel and street photography made in Europe and Palestine, 1921–1923.
- Paul Citroen, Metropolis, PK-F-57.337, 1923.
- Emmy Andriesse, Photographs, 1930–1953.
- Jan Wolkers, Archive, 1930–2007.
- Frans Kellendonk, Archive, 1971–1991.
- Hendrik Kerstens, Paula photograph series, 1992– .
- Erwin Olaf, Liberty: Plague and Hunger during the Siege of Leiden, PK-F-2011-0036, 2011.

== Librarians of Leiden University ==
Since the founding of the university in 1575 there have been 25 Librarians of Leiden University:

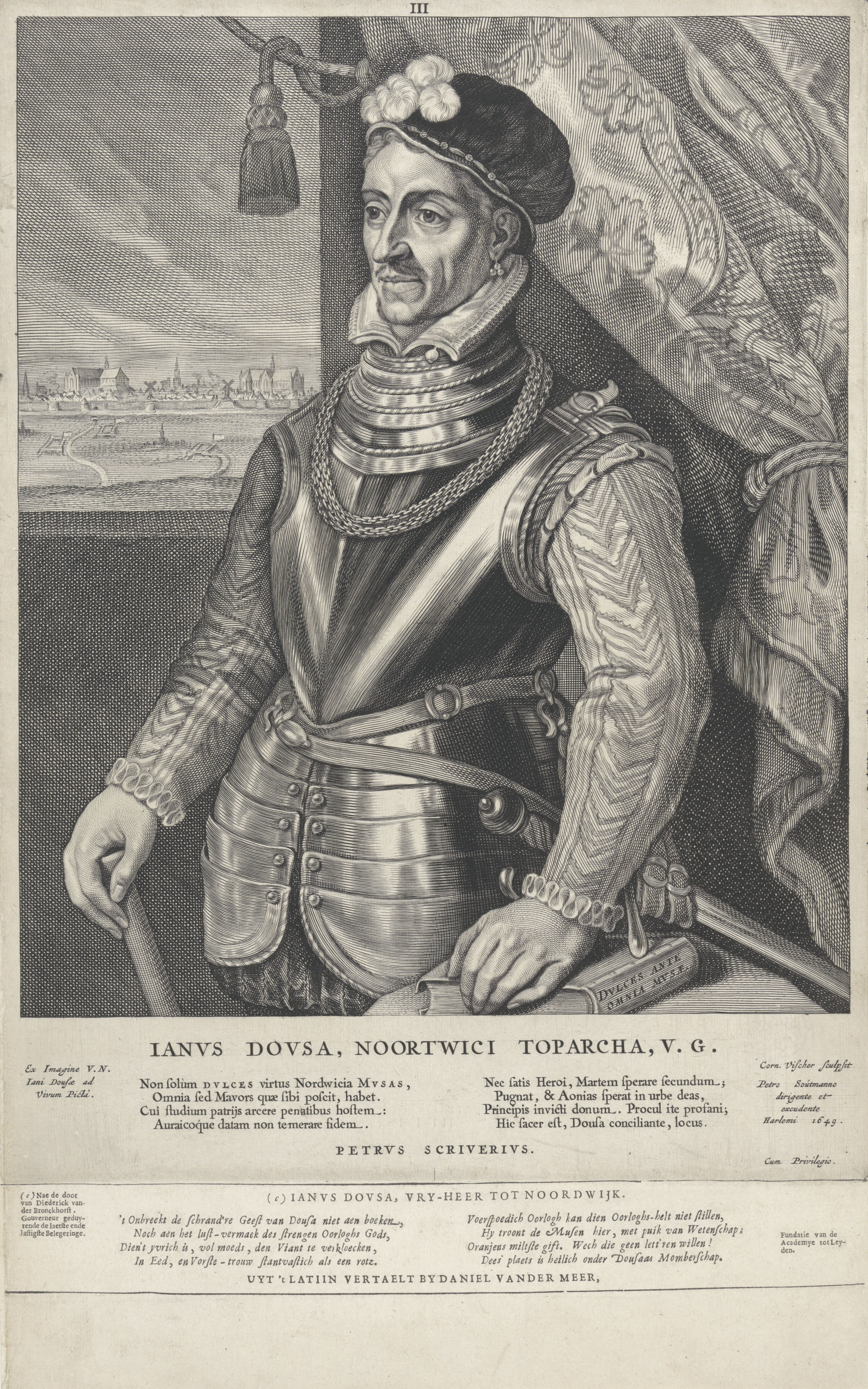
Cornelis (de) Visscher (II) and Pieter Soutman: Portrait of Johan van der Does (Janus Dousa), first Librarian of Leiden University (1585–1593), 1649.

- Janus Dousa (1585–1593)
- Janus Dousa Jr. (1593–1596)
- Paulus Merula (1597–1607)
- Daniel Heinsius (1607–1655)
- Anthony Thysius the Younger (1655–1665)
- Johannes Fredericus Gronovius (1665–1671)
- Fredericus Spanheim (1672–1701)
- Wolferdus Senguerdius (1701–1724)
- Petrus Burmannus (1724–1741)
- David van Royen (1741)
- Abraham Gronovius (1741–1775)
- David Ruhnkenius (1775–1798)
- Daniel Wyttenbach (1798–1820)
- Johannes van Voorst (1820–1833)
- Jacob Geel (1833–1858)
- Willem George Pluygers (1859–1879)
- Willem Nicolaas du Rieu (1880–1897)
- Scato Gocko de Vries (1897–1924)
- Frederik Casparus Wieder (1924–1938)
- Tietse Pieter Sevensma (1938–1947)
- Antoine Hubert Marie Cornelis Kessen (1947–1961)
- Johan Remmet de Groot (1961–1983)
- Jacques van Gent (1983–1993)
- Paul Gerretsen (1994–2004)
- Kurt De Belder (2005–present)

== Library locations ==
=== Present locations ===
==== The Netherlands ====
===== Leiden =====
- University Library (Main site), Witte Singel 27, Leiden. Architect: Bart van Kasteel.
- Academic Historical Museum, Rapenburg 73, Leiden.
- African Library, Witte Singel 27A, Leiden (African Studies Centre, Leiden).
- Asian Library, Witte Singel 27, Leiden. Architect: Katja Hogenboom studio with FELSCH Architecten.
- Law Library, Steenschuur 25, Leiden.
- Middle Eastern Library, Witte Singel 27A, Leiden.
- Science Library, Einsteinweg 55, Leiden.
- Social and Behavioral Sciences Library, Wassenaarseweg 52, Leiden.
- Walaeus Library (LUMC), Albinusdreef 2, Leiden.

===== The Hague =====
- Wijnhaven Library, Campus The Hague, Turfmarkt 99, The Hague.

==== Indonesia ====
- KITLV-Jakarta, Jl. H.R. Rasuna Said Kav S-3, Jakarta, Indonesia.

=== Former locations ===
1587–1595: Academiegebouw, Rapenburg 73, Leiden.

1595–1983: Faliede Bagijnkerk, Old University Library, now Leiden University Board, Rapenburg 70, Leiden.

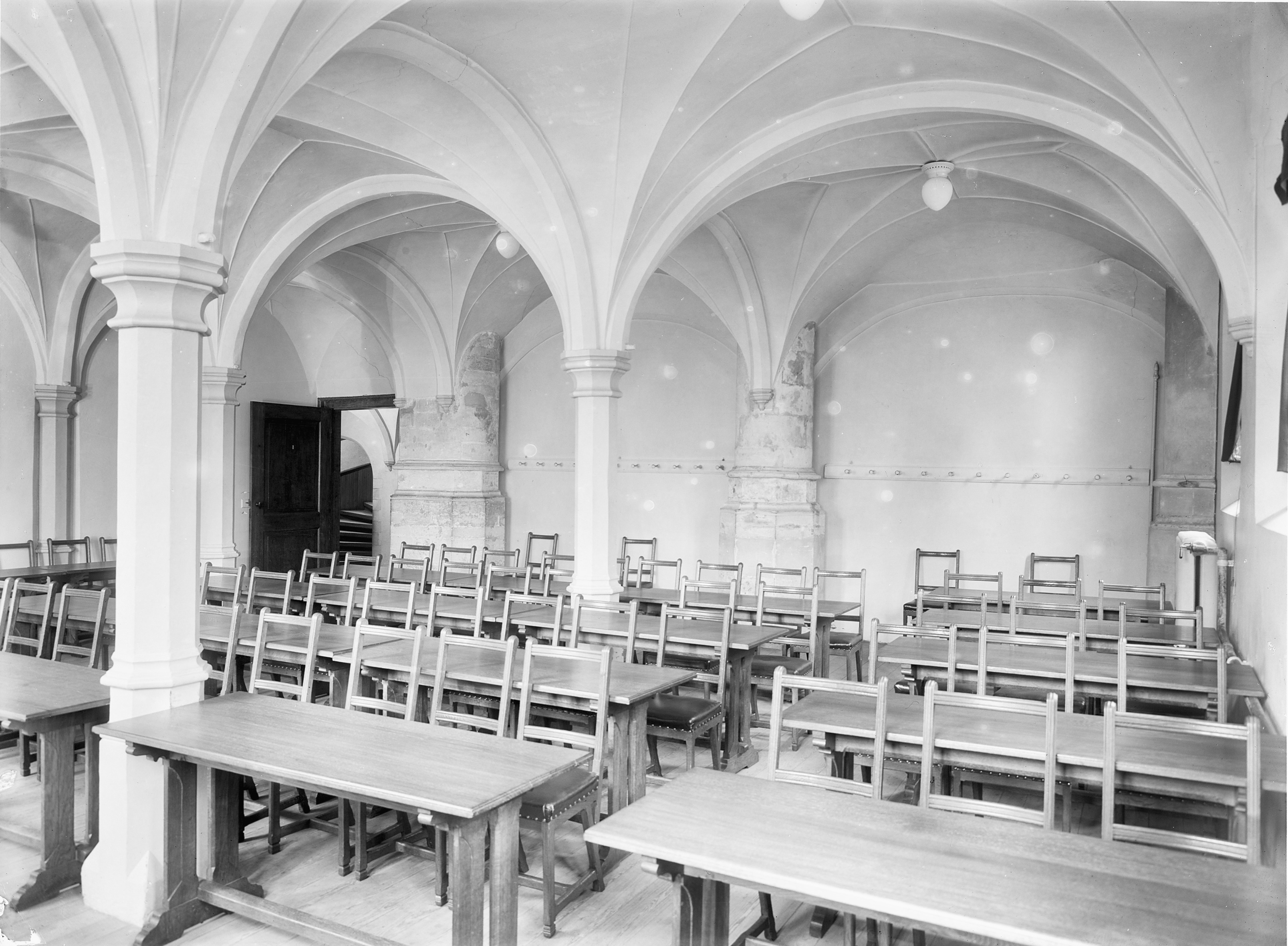
Vault room at Rapenburg 73, the library location in 1587–1595, 1940.

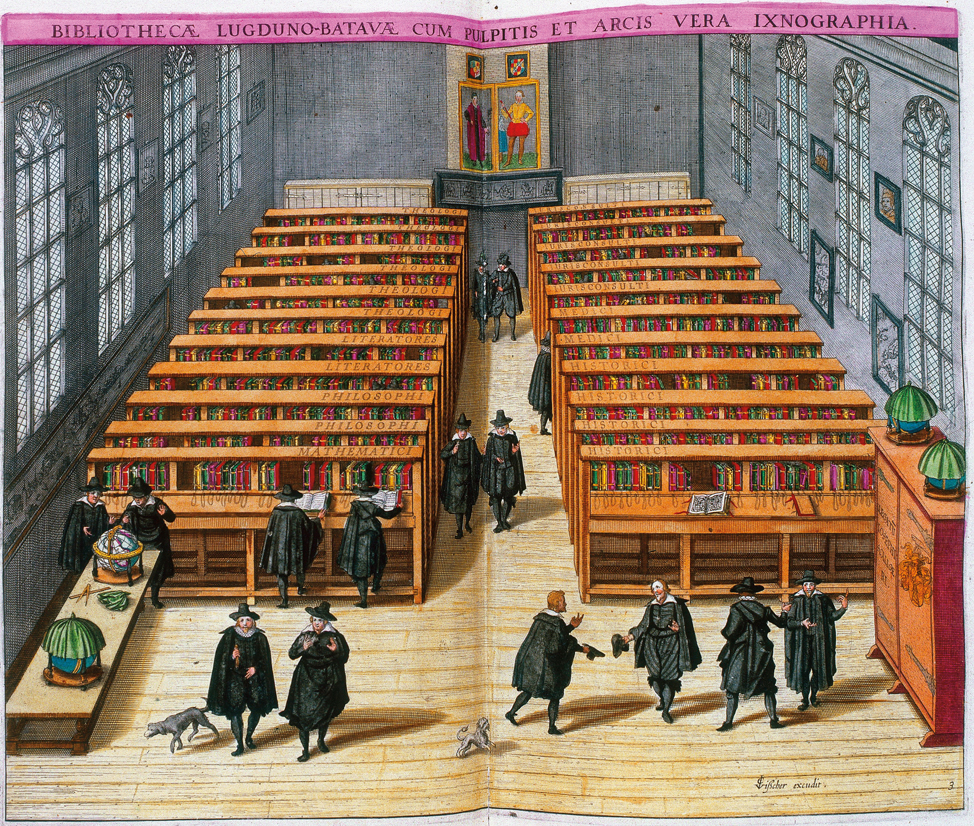
Jan Cornelisz. van 't Woudt: Rapenburg 73, 1610. Print from Stedeboeck der Nederlanden, Amsterdam: Willem Blaeu, 1649.

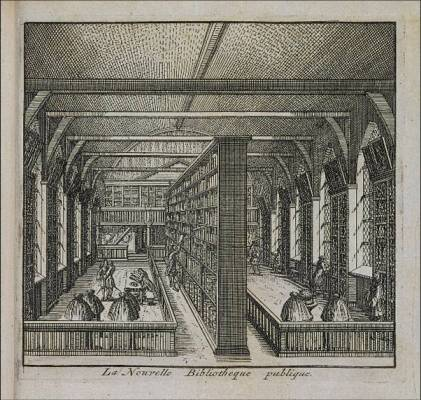
Rapenburg 70, 1694. "La nouvelle bibliothèque" (The new library), from Les delices de Leide, une des célèbres villes de l'Europe, Leiden: P. van der Aa, 1712.

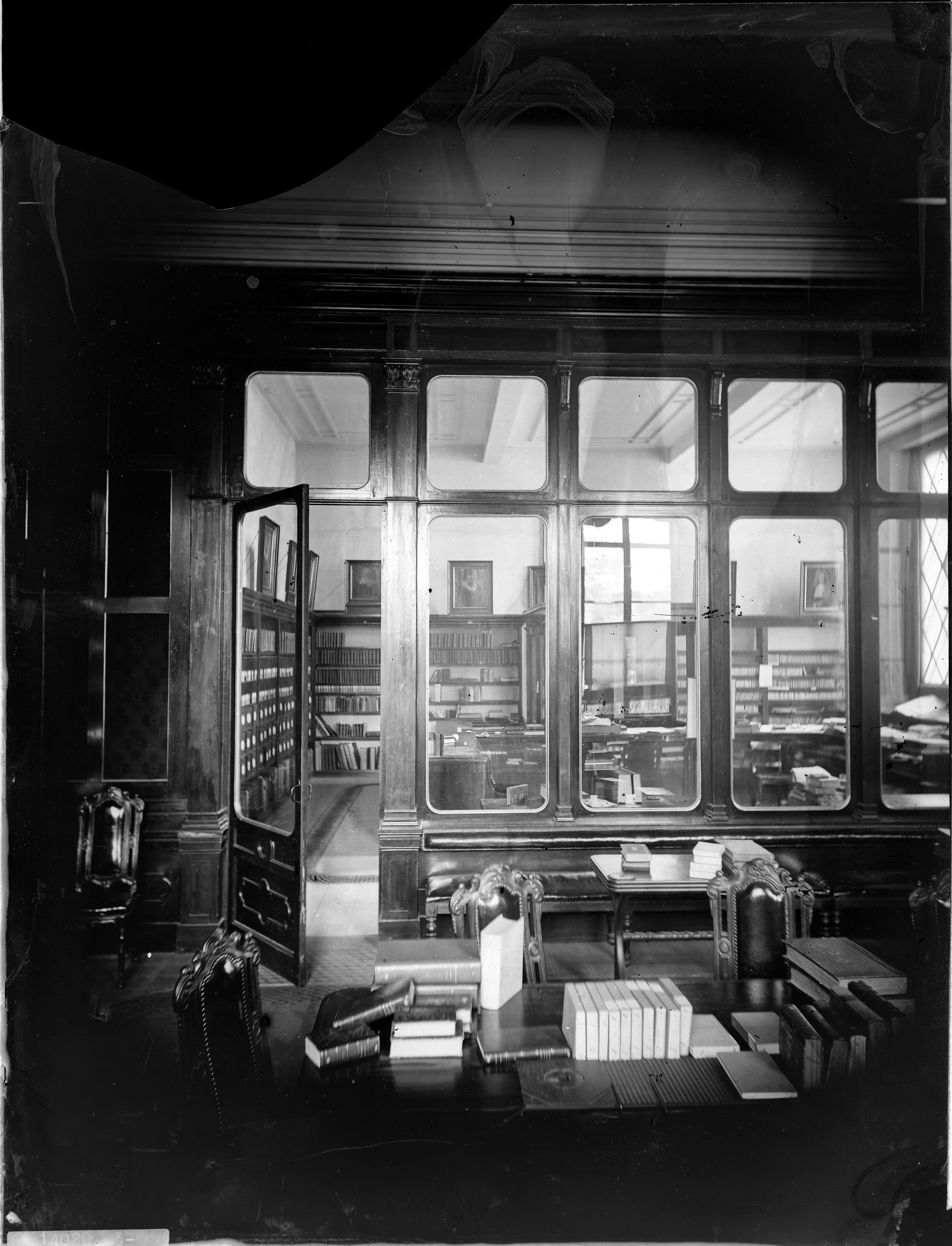
Jan Goedeljee (1824–1905): Interior of the University Library. Glass negative, circa 1880.

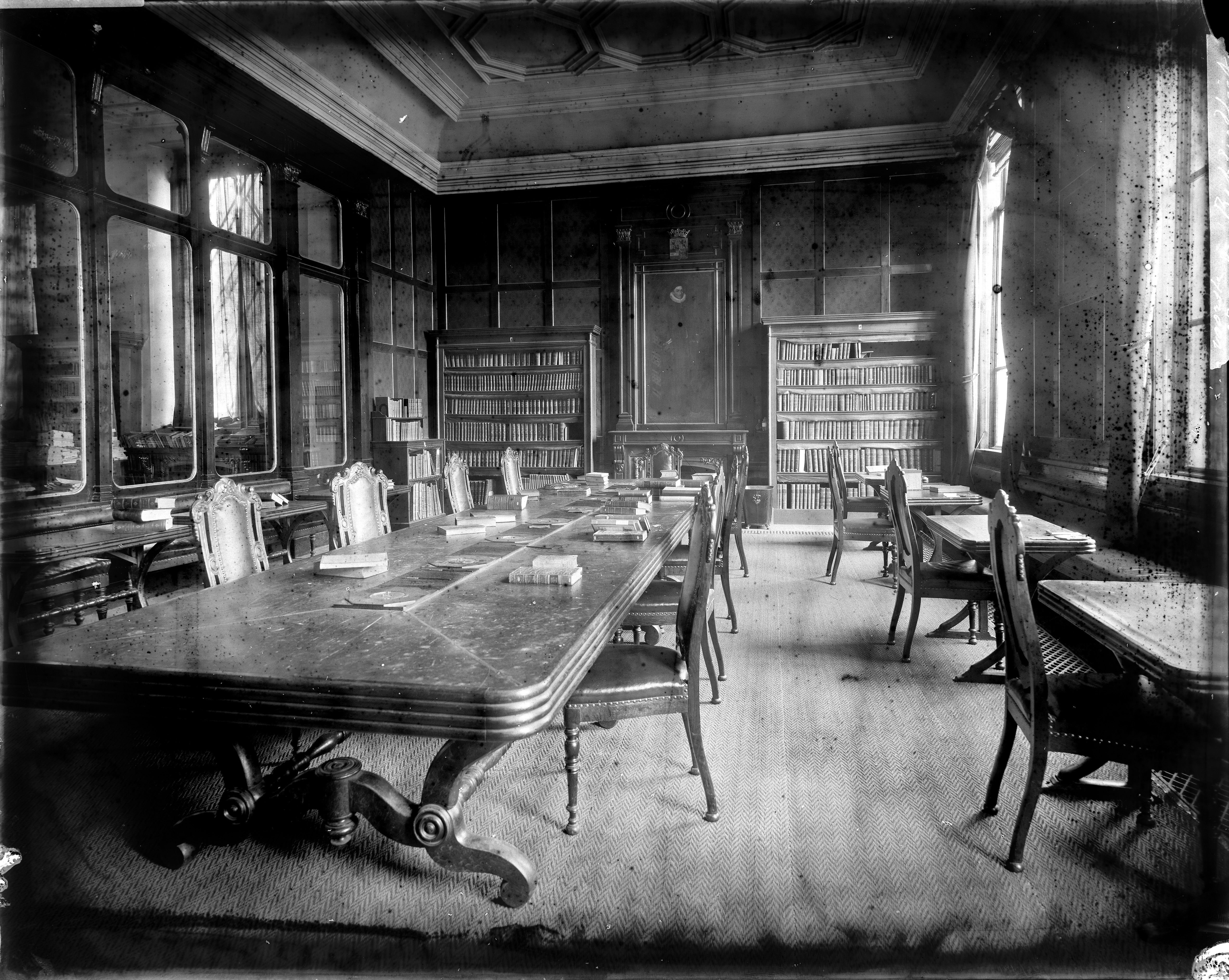
Jan Goedeljee: Reading room, University Library. Glass negative, circa 1880.

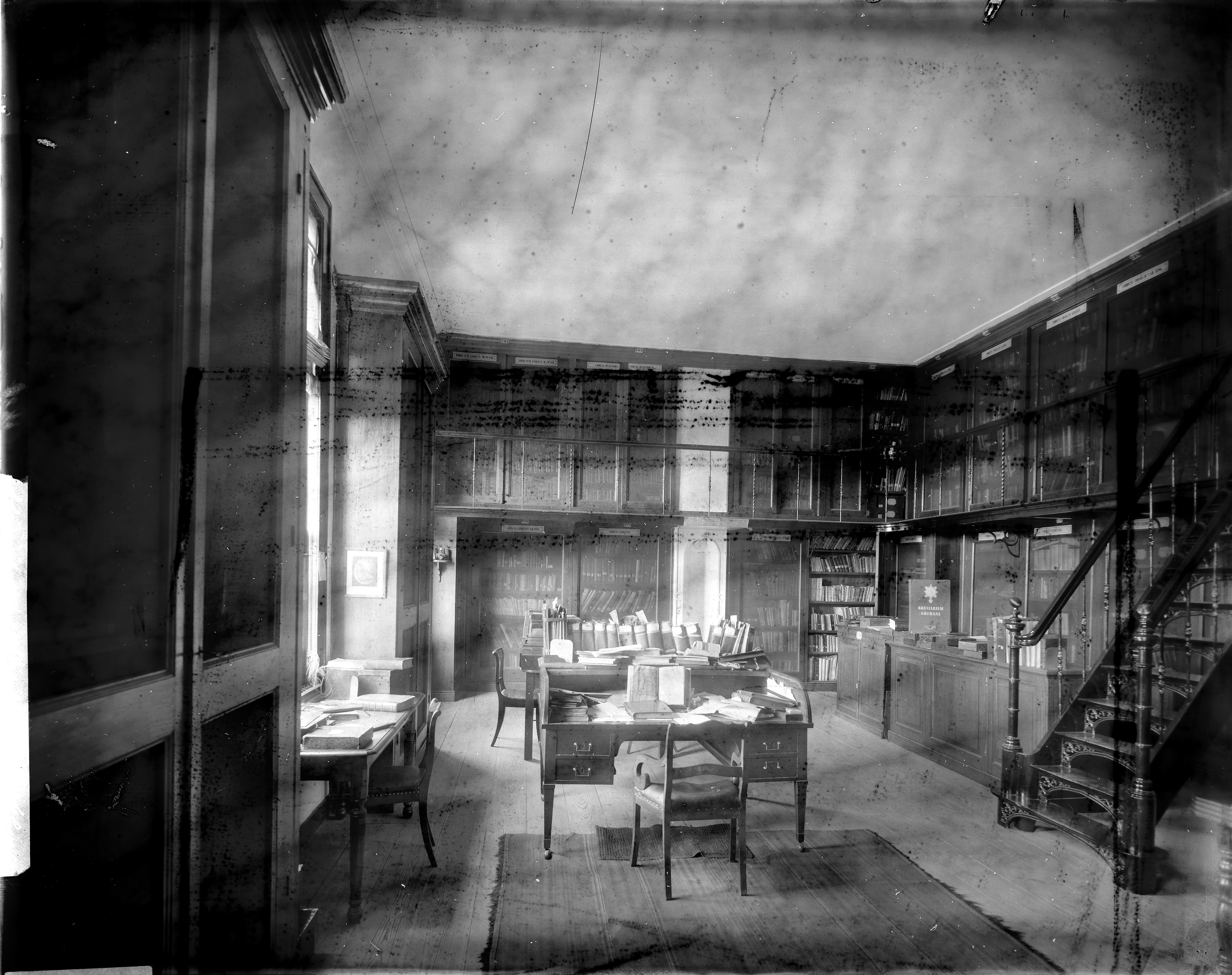
Jan Goedeljee: Reading room, University Library. Glass negative, circa 1880.

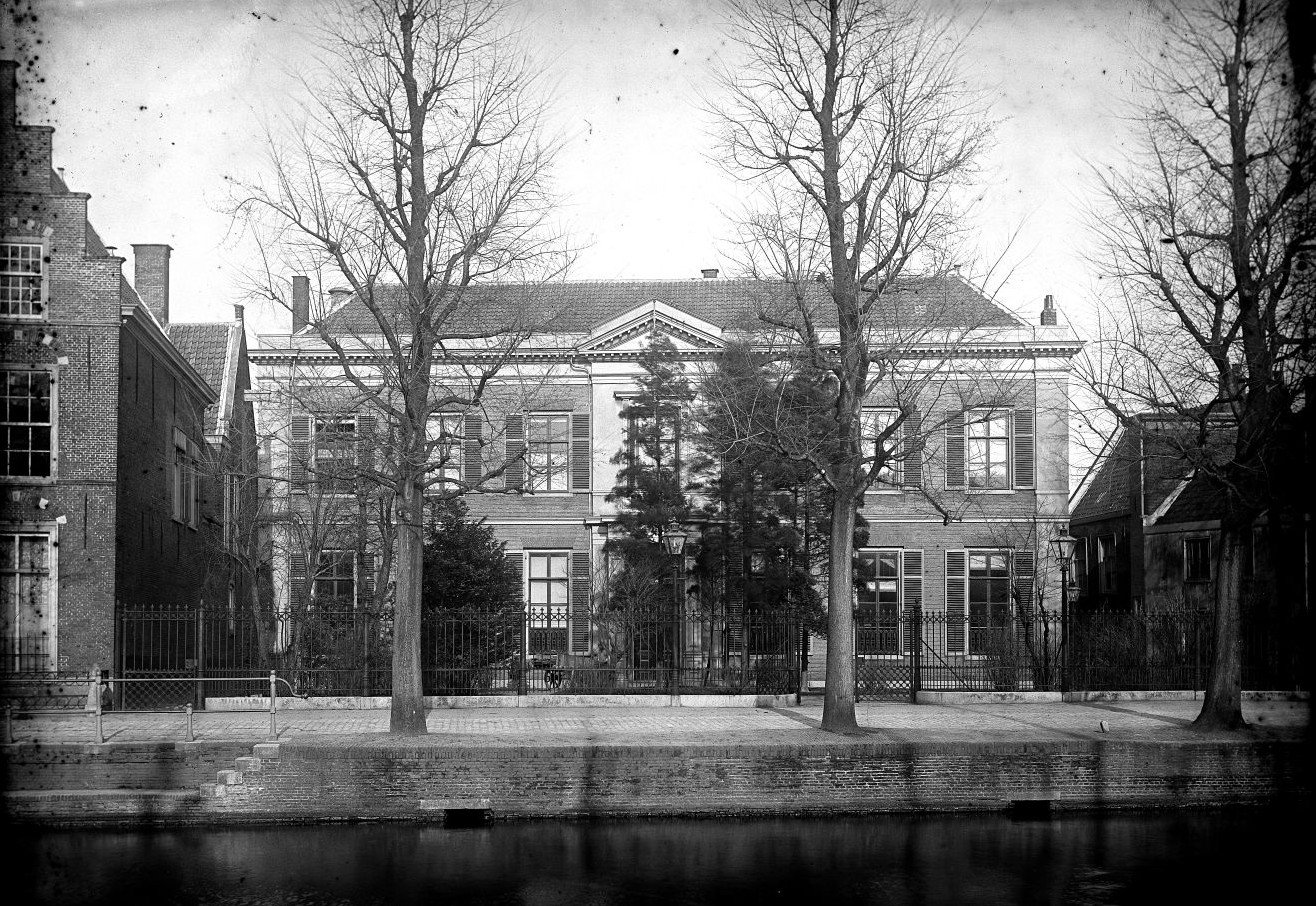
Jan Goedeljee: Rapenburg 70, around 1890.

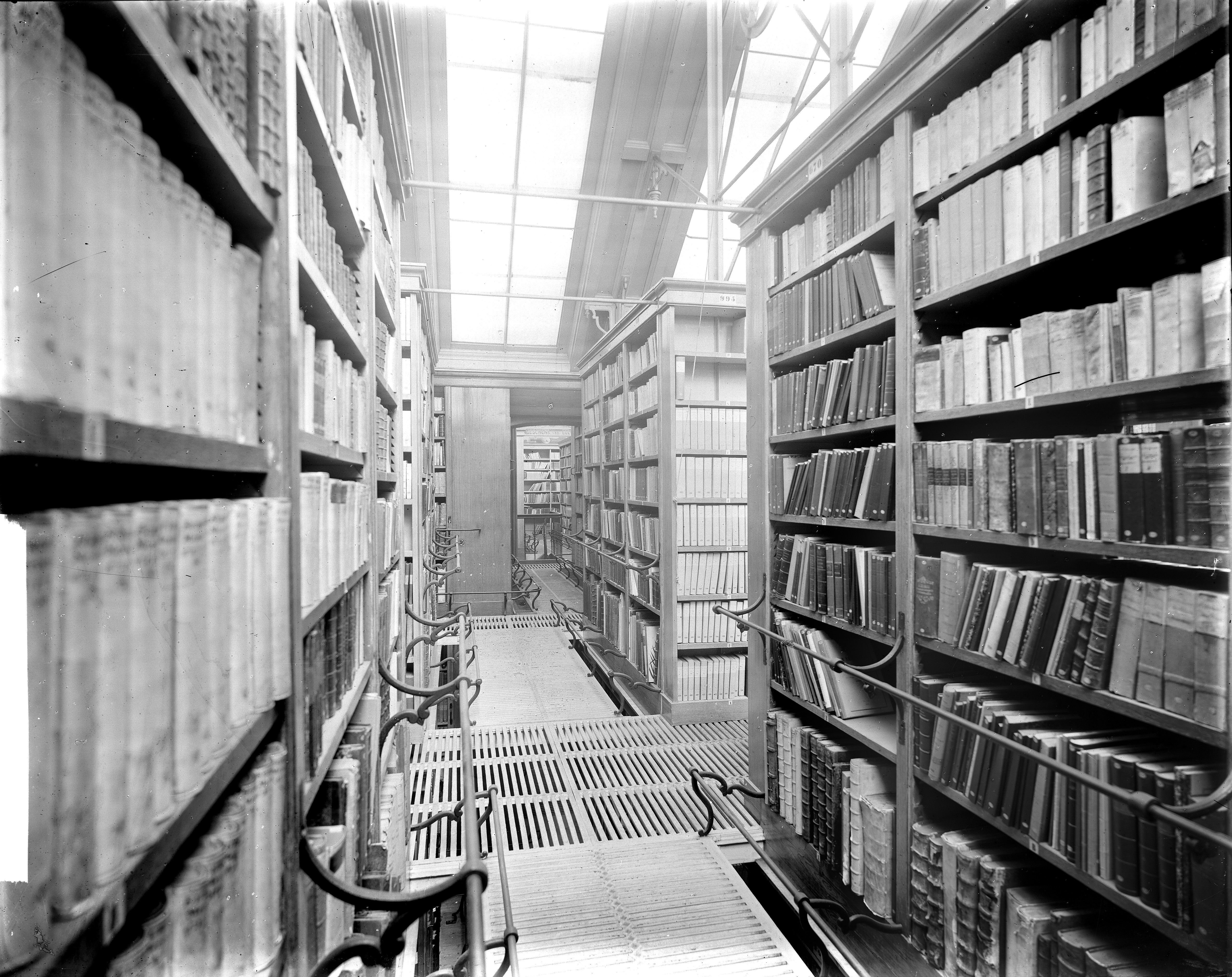
Depot of the Leiden University Library, around 1900.

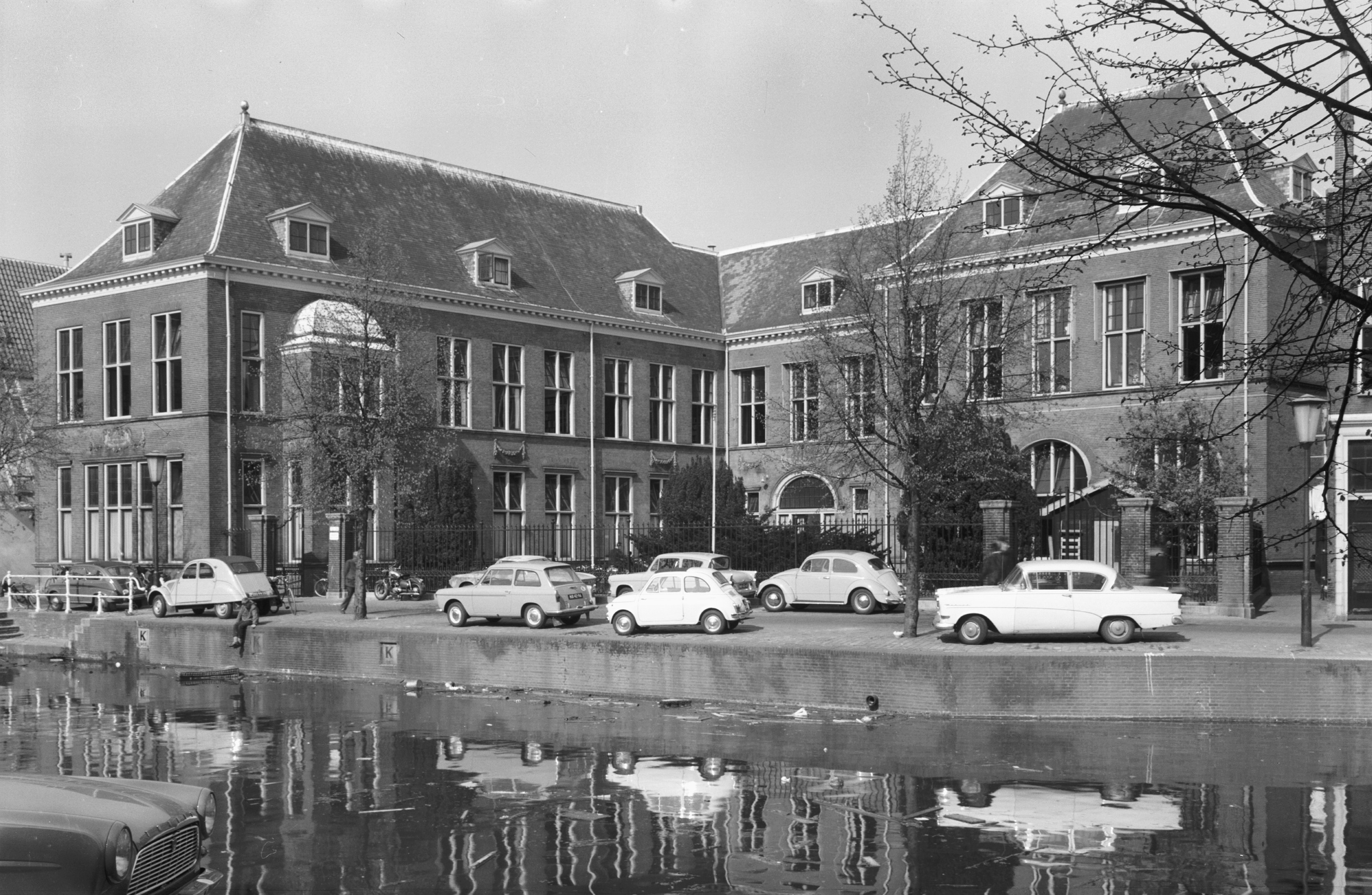
Rapenburg 70, 1963.

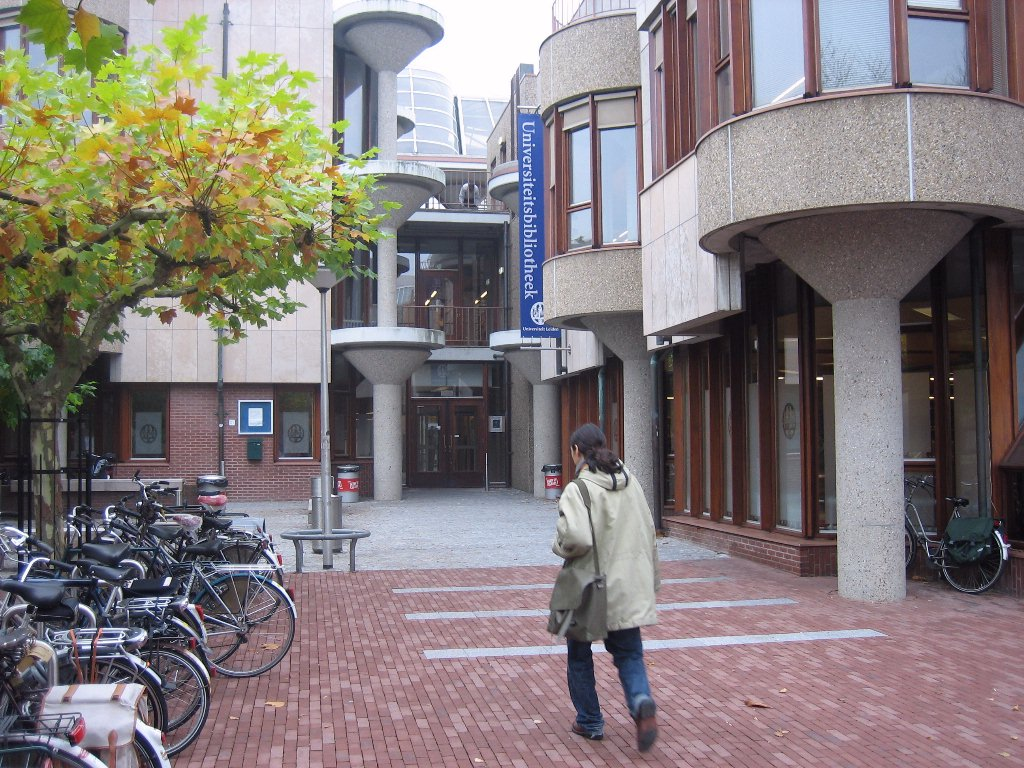
Current location: Witte Singel 27, 2006.

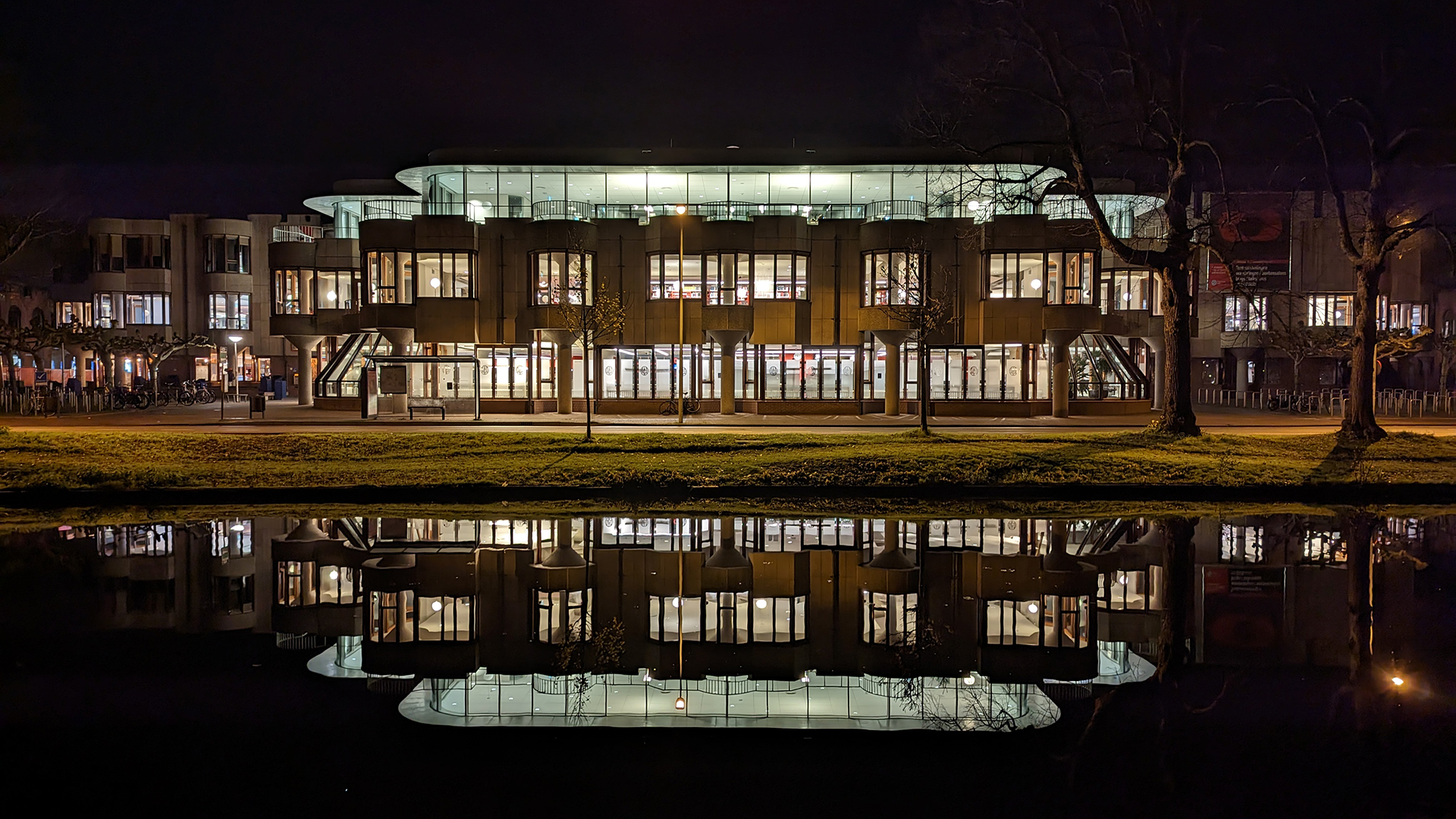
Leiden University Library on the Witte Singel, 2023.

== Leiden University Libraries in fiction ==
- Dutch author Frans Kellendonk (1951–1990) located his novel Letter en Geest. Een spookverhaal. (1982) in Leiden University Libraries. The main character in the novel Frits Mandaat replaces a sick colleague in the library. Kellendonk worked briefly in 1979 as a subject specialist for English literature at Leiden University Libraries.

== Membership of professional organisations ==
Leiden University Libraries participates in:

=== The Netherlands ===
- UKB, Cooperating Dutch University Libraries and National Library (Dutch: Universiteitsbibliotheken & Koninklijke Bibliotheek, UKB), a Dutch consortium.
- Dutch Foundation for Academic Heritage (Dutch: Stichting Academisch Erfgoed, SAE).

=== International ===
- AI4LAM - Artificial Intelligence for Libraries, Archives & Museum. Founding Member.
- Association of European Research Libraries (LIBER).
- International Federation of Library Associations and Institutions (IFLA).
- International Image Interoperability Framework (IIIF, 'Triple I F'). Founding member.
- OAPEN – Open Access Publishing.
- OpenAIRE to ensure a permanent open scholarly communication infrastructure to support European research.

== Programmes ==
Leiden University Libraries hosts public presentations on various topics related to its collections and publishes podcasts. These programmes are mostly in Dutch.

- UBL Boekensalon (UBL Book Café). Interview programme on books with authors discussing their work and library specialists showing relevant collection items. Featured authors include: Nadine Akkerman, Abdelkader Benali, Louise Fresco, Arnon Grunberg, Wilt Idema, Gert Oostindie, Frits van Oostrom, and Jean-Marc van Tol.
- UBL Podcast. Conversations with researchers about specific topics illustrated by items from the Leiden special collections, such as Kakera Akotie, cuneiform tablets, Joseph Dalton Hooker, Christiaan Huygens, decolonisation, freedom of religion, Hugo Grotius, indentured servitude, Herta Mohr, piracy in the Caribbean, prosecution of homosexual Leiden students, Caspar Reuvens, Shahnameh The Book of Kings, slavery, Sranan Tongo, and student revolt.
- Van kluis naar kussen (From Safe to Presentation Cushion). Conversations with researchers, students, curators and other experts and on Leiden collections: anatomical drawings, Bibliotheca Thysiana, Charles Baudelaire, Chinese collections, Collection of the Maatschappij der Nederlandse Letterkunde, conservation and restoration, Dutch Caribbean and Suriname literature, letters, maps and atlases, Medieval manuscripts, photography, portraits, prints and drawings, song collection, and women artists.

== Exhibitions ==
Leiden University Libraries organizes extensive exhibitions in collaboration with museums including:

- Light over Dejima. SieboldHuis, Leiden, 25 September 2026 - 28 February 2027.
- Leiden Celebrates – 450 years of Parades. Museum De Lakenhal, Leiden, 21 September 2024 – 2 March 2025.
- Hello darkness, my old friend. Kunsthal, Rotterdam, 15 June – 22 September 2024.
- Between the Lines. Prints from Leiden University in Museum Bredius. Museum Bredius, The Hague, 25 April – 30 June 2024.
- Strijden ga ik – Anton de Kom en de Surinaamse Studenten Unie. Museum De Lakenhal, Leiden, 10 November 2023 – 7 July 2024.
- Steef Zoetmulder. Kunsthal, Rotterdam, 2 September 2023 – 7 January 2024.
- Hendrik & Paula Kerstens: Self-Reflective. Museum Hilversum, Hilversum, 9 April 2023 – 25 June 2023.
- Kaarten: navigeren en manipuleren. National Museum of Ethnology, Leiden, 21 October 2022 – 29 October 2023.
- Books that made History. Rijksmuseum van Oudheden, Leiden, 22 June 2022 – 4 September 2022.
- Alexine Tinne, photographer – her world view. Haags Historisch Museum, The Hague, 26 January 2022 – 12 Juni 2022.
- Photography Becomes Art. Photo-Secession in Holland 1890–1937. The Hague Museum of Photography, The Hague, 7 September 2019 – 8 December 2019.
- Leiden Celebrates! Highlights of an Academic Collection. Rembrandt House Museum, Amsterdam, 17 October 2014 – 26 January 2015.
- Straatwerken (drawings by 17th century artist Leonaert Bramer). Westfries Museum, Hoorn, 14 December 2013 – 3 March 2014.
- World Treasures! From Cicero to Erwin Olaf. Discover the Special Collections of Leiden University. Stedelijk Museum De Lakenhal, Leiden, 9 March 2013 – 30 June 2013.
- Turcksche boucken (Turkish books) from Levinus Warner. A seventeenth century diplomat and book collector in Istanbul. Museum Meermanno, House of the Book, The Hague, 15 December 2012 – 3 March 2013.
- Sweet&Salt. Water and the Dutch. Kunsthal, Rotterdam, 14 February 2012 – 10 June 2012.
- Erwin Olaf: Relief of Leiden. Stedelijk Museum De Lakenhal and Leiden University Libraries, Leiden, 29 September 2011 – 8 January 2012.
- In Atmospheric Light. Picturalism in Dutch Photography 1890–1925. Rembrandt House Museum, Amsterdam, 1 April 2010 – 20 June 2010.
- Photography! A special collection at Leiden University. The Hague Museum of Photography, The Hague, 23 January 2010 – 18 April 2010.
- On route to the Golden Age – Hendrick Goltzius & Jacob de Gheyn II. Limburg Museum, Venlo, 28 November 2009 – 28 February 2010.
- City of Books. Seven Centuries of Reading in Leiden. Stedelijk Museum De Lakenhal, Leiden, 22 February 2008 – 1 June 2008.
- Goed gezien. Tien eeuwen wetenschap in handschrift en druk. Rijksmuseum van Oudheden, Leiden. 30 October 1987 – 17 January 1988.

Furthermore, Leiden University Libraries often serves as lender to exhibitions by museums in The Netherlands and abroad.

== Publications ==
=== General (selection) ===
- Berkvens-Stevelinck, Christiane (2012). Magna commoditas : Leiden University's great asset : 425 years library collections and services. Translated by UvA Talen, Amsterdam. Leiden: Leiden University Press. hdl:1887/21412. ISBN 978-90-8728-165-6. OCLC 794706996. Enlarged and updated edition, full-text online.
- Berkvens-Stevelinck, Christiane, ed. (1975). Quaestiones leidenses. Twelve studies on Leiden University Library and its holdings published on the occasion of the quarter-centenary of the university. Leiden: University Library. ISBN 978-90-221-9996-1. OCLC 5124440.
- Hulshoff Pol, Elfriede (1975). "The Library". In Lunsingh Scheurleer, Th. H.; Posthumus Meyjes, G.H.M.; Bachrach, Alfred Gustave Herbert (eds.). Leiden University in the seventeenth century : an exchange of learning. Leiden: Brill. pp. 394–459. ISBN 978-90-04-04267-4. OCLC 1676723. 496 pages.

=== Collections (selection) ===
- (in Dutch, Japanese, and English) Licht over Deshima - 出島に降り注ぐ光 - Light over Dejima. Edited by Maartje van den Heuvel & Akiyoshi Tani. Zwolle: W BOOKS, 2026. ISBN 978-94-6258-797-7
- (in Dutch) Jef Schaeps. hedendaagse kunst in de leidse universiteits bibliotheek. Jef Schaeps, 2026. ISBN 978-90-90-42312-8
- (in English) Kuniko Forrer & Matthi Forrer. Nippon. Japan through the Eyes of Philipp Franz von Siebold, 1832-1852. Tielt: Lannoo, 2026, ISBN 978-90-5996-153-1
- (in Dutch) Kuniko Forrer & Matthi Forrer. Nippon. Japan door de ogen van Philipp Franz von Siebold, 1832-1852. Tielt: Lannoo, 2026, ISBN 978-90-5996-017-6
- (in English) André Bouwman & Irene O'Daly. Written Treasures. 50 Manuscripts from Medieval Europe. Tielt: Lannoo, 2025, ISBN 978-94-014-3291-7
- (in Dutch) André Bouwman & Irene O'Daly. Schatten op schrift. 50 manuscripten uit middeleeuws Europa. Tielt: Lannoo, 2025, ISBN 978-94-014-3287-0
- (in English) Enduring Encounters. Maps of Japan from Leiden University Libraries. Edited by Radu Leca and Martijn Storms. Leiden: Brill, 2025, ISBN 978-90-04-36343-4 Digital version
- (in English) Prophets, Poets and Scholars. The Collections of the Middle Eastern Library of Leiden University. Edited by: Arnoud Vrolijk, Kasper van Ommen, Karin Scheper, Tijmen Baarda. Leiden: Leiden University Press, 2024, ISBN 978-90-8728-407-7
- (in German) Karten : ein Atlas der Weltgeschichte. Martijn Storms (ed.). München: Prestel, 2024, ISBN 978-3-7913-8048-3
- (in Dutch) Tot Publijcque Dienst der Studie. Boeken uit de Bibliotheca Thysiana. Redactie: Wim van Anrooij & Paul Hoftijzer. Hilversum: Verloren, 2023. ISBN 978-94-6455-003-0
- (in Dutch and English) Self-Reflective. Hendrik & Paula Kerstens. Maartje van den Heuvel (ed.). Zwolle: W Books, 2023. ISBN 978-94-6258-557-7
- (in English) Maps That Made History. 1000 Years of World History in 100 Old Maps. Martijn Storms (ed.). Tielt: Lannoo, 2022. ISBN 978-94-014-8530-2
- (in Dutch) Kaarten die geschiedenis schreven. 1000 jaar wereldgeschiedenis in 100 oude kaarten. Martijn Storms (ed.). Tielt: Lannoo, 2022. ISBN 978-94-014-8529-6
- (in English) Books That Made History. 25 Books from Leiden That Changed the World. Edited by: Kasper van Ommen and Garrelt Verhoeven. Leiden: Brill, 2022. ISBN 978-90-04-52342-5
- (in Dutch) Boeken die geschiedenis schreven. Redactie: Kasper van Ommen & Garrelt Verhoeven. Amsterdam: Athenaeum, 2022. ISBN 978-90-253-1479-8
- (in Dutch) Kester Freriks & Martijn Storms. Grensverkenningen. Langs oude grenzen in Nederland. Amsterdam: Athenaeum, 2022. ISBN 978-90-253-1463-7
- (in Dutch and English) Fotografie wordt Kunst. Photo-Secession in Holland 1890–1937. Photography Becomes Art. Photo-Secession in Holland 1890–1937. Concept, image editing and text: Maartje van den Heuvel. Zwolle: WBOOKS in collaboration with Leiden University Libraries, 2019. ISBN 978-94-6258-358-0
- (in English) Voyage of Discovery. Exploring the Collections of the Asian Library at Leiden University. Edited by: Alexander Reeuwijk. Leiden: Leiden University Press, 2017. ISBN 978-90-8728-274-5 Digital version
- (in English) Luitgard Mols & Arnoud Vrolijk. Western Arabia in the Leiden Collections. Traces of a Colourful Past. Leiden: Leiden University Press, 2016. ISBN 978-90-8728-259-2 Digital version
- (in English) For Study and Delight. Drawings and Prints from Leiden University. Edited by: Jef Schaeps, Elmer Kolfin, Edward Grasman, Nelke Bartelings. Leiden: Leiden University Press, 2016. ISBN 978-90-8728-241-7
- (in Dutch) Leiden viert feest. Hoogtepunten uit een academische collectie. Onder redactie van Jef Schaeps en Jaap van der Ven. Leiden: Leiden University Press, 2014. ISBN 978-90-8728-220-2
- (in Dutch and English) Arnoud Vrolijk, Jan Schmidt & Karin Scheper. Turcksche boucken. De oosterse verzameling van Levinus Warner, Nederlands diplomaat in zeventiende-eeuws Istanbul. The Oriental collection of Levinus Warner, Dutch diplomat in seventeenth-century Istanbul. Eindhoven: Lecturis, 2012. ISBN 978-90-70108-93-9
- (in English) Corien J.M. Vuurman. Nineteenth-century Persia in the Photographs of Albert Hotz. Images from the Hotz Photograph Collection of Leiden University Library, the Netherlands. Rotterdam en Gronsveld: Barjesteh van Waalwijk van Doorn & Co's Uitgeversmaatschappij, 2011. ISBN 978-90-5613-000-8
- (in Dutch and English) Maartje van den Heuvel, Janrense Boonstra & Jan van Dijk. In atmospherisch licht. Picturalisme in de Nederlandse fotografie 1890–1925. In Atmospheric Light. Picturalism in Dutch Photography 1890–1925. Zwolle: Waanders, 2010. ISBN 978-90-400-7686-2
- (in English) Maartje van den Heuvel & Wim van Sinderen. Photography! A Special Collection at Leiden University. Leiden: Leiden University & the Hague Museum of Photography, 2010. ISBN 978-90-89101-91-4
- (in Dutch) Fotovoorkeuren. 50 auteurs kiezen een foto uit de collectie van het Leids Prentenkabinet. Onder redactie van Joke Pronk & Tineke de Ruiter. Amsterdam: Voetnoot, 2007. ISBN 978-90-78068-15-0
- (in Dutch) Bronnen van kennis. Wetenschap, kunst en cultuur in de collecties van de Leidse Universiteitsbibliotheek. Onder redactie van Paul Hoftijzer, Kasper van Ommen, Geert Warnar & Jan Just Witkam. Leiden: Primavera Pers, 2006. ISBN 978-90-5997-028-1
- (in Dutch) Oostersche weelde. De Oriënt in westerse kunst en cultuur. Met een keuze uit de verzameling van de Leidse Universiteitsbibliotheek. Onder redactie van Jef Schaeps, Kasper van Ommen & Arnoud Vrolijk. Leiden: Primavera Pers, 2005. ISBN 978-90-5997-023-6
- (in English) Hora est! On dissertations. Leiden, 2005. Digital version
- (in English) Jan Oort, astronomer, with contrib. by Jet Katgert-Merkelijn & Jos Damen (Q58161949). Leiden, 2000. Digital version
- (in Dutch) Goed gezien. Tien eeuwen wetenschap in handschrift en druk. Eindredactie R. Breugelmans. Leiden 1987. ISBN 978-90-6385-141-5
- (in English) R. Breugelmans: Leiden imprints 1483–1600 in Leiden University Library and Bibliotheca Thysiana. A short-title catalogue. Nieuwkoop, De Graaf, 1974. ISBN 978-90-6004-341-7

== See also ==
- List of libraries in the Netherlands
