= Anonymus Leidensis =

Anonymus Leidensis is the conventional designation of the anonymous author of the 9th-century Latin geographical treatise De situ orbis ("On the Location of the Earth"). It was written between 856 and 870, its title borrowed from a classical work of Pomponius Mela.

The Anonymus was a monk teaching in a monastic school in the Carolingian Empire. He claims to be writing at the request of his fellow monks and his students, who wanted a better understanding of the recent Viking raids that penetrated the interior of Gaul from the Mediterranean via the rivers. According to him, although the Earth's features can be perceived "by both the corporeal eyes and the internal mental glance", he gives pride of place to the latter—intellectual apprehension—and thus to written authorities. Natural phenomena will remain mysteries to mankind, since "all the reasons of this world are known to [God] alone".

De situ follows Isidore of Seville's Etymologies in approach, describing the Earth and giving supposed etymologies of the names of places. It is divided into two books, the first on seas and islands and the second on land. It is based not on experience, but on written sources, including Mela, Isidore, Martianus Capella, Aethicus Ister, Julius Solinus and Paulus Orosius. These are only inconsistently updated where their information is anachronistic. For example, following Solinus, Anonymus presents the Irish as polytheists. The sources are listed in one place and not always cited where used, even if their text is being borrowed verbatim.

The term "Leidensis" refers to the location of the only known copy of De situ, which is now in the Leiden University Library. This manuscript was copied at Auxerre in the late 9th century. It is now shelfmark Voss. Lat. F. 113, p. II.

== Bibliography ==
- Lozovsky, Natalia (1996). "Carolingian Geographical Tradition: Was It Geography?". Early Medieval Europe. 5 (1): 25–43.
- Lozovsky, Natalia (2000). The Earth Is Our Book: Geographical Knowledge in the Latin West, ca. 400–1000. University of Michigan Press.
- Quadri, Riccardo, ed. (1974). Anonymi Leidensis De situ orbis libri duo. Editrice Antenore.
