= Johannes van Voorst =

Dutch theologian and librarian

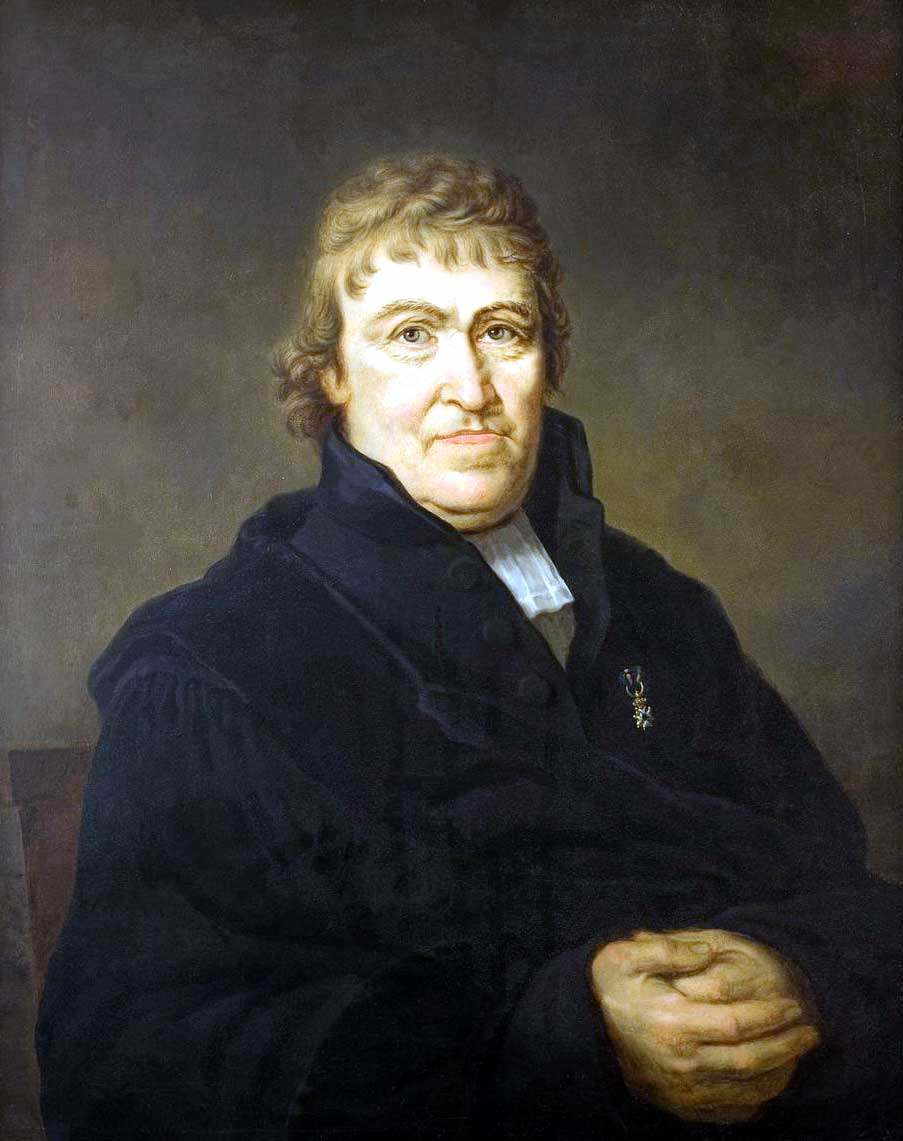
- Louis Moritz (1773–1850): Johannes van Voorst, around 1820. Leiden University Library.
- Born: 17 March 1757; Delft, Dutch Republic
- Died: 29 July 1833 (aged 76); Leiden, the Netherlands
- Education: Leiden University
- Scientific career
- Fields: theology, New Testament studies, library science
- Workplaces: Leiden University
- Thesis: Dissertatio philologica de notabili correctionum Masorethicarum genere, quod spectat loca controversa, ubi negativam in affirmativam, et affirmativam contra in negativam sententiam converti valunt, Leiden 1778

Johannes van Voorst (Joannes van Voorst, 17 March 1757 – 29 July 1833) was a Dutch Reformed theologian, pastor, theology professor and Leiden University librarian.

== Biography ==
Van Voorst was born on 17 March 1757 in Delft. He read theology at Leiden from 1773-1778, and subsequently worked as a pastor in the Netherlands, in Hall (in Gelderland near Brummen), Wageningen, en Zierikzee. In 1799 he returned to Leiden to become a university professor of Christian Antiquities and the History of Christian Dogma. From 1819 up to his death in 1833 he was the head of Leiden University Library. Van Voorst was university rector in 1803-1804, 1808-1809, and 1816-1817.

He died on 29 July 1833 in Leiden.

== Publications ==
His publications include:

=== in Latin ===
- van Voorst, Joannes (1778). Dissertatio philologica de notabili correctionum Masorethicarum genere, quod spectat loca controversa, ubi negativam in affirmativam, et affirmativam contra in negativam sententiam converti valunt (in Latin). Leiden: Jean le Maire.. Linguistic thesis on the Old Testament.
- Oratio de temporum nostrorum ad promovendam religionis causam opportunitate (in Latin). Franeker: Widow Gulielmus (Willem) Coulon. 1788. OCLC 65078532. 76 pages. Dutch translation Amsterdam 1797.
- Oratio de injusto theologiae ad scholae legem diligenter exactae contemtu, Franeker 1791.
- Oratio de scriptorum veterum Christianorum studio prudenter et liberaliter excolendo, Leiden 1799.
- Oratio de J. A. Ernestio optimo post H. Grotium duce et magistro interpretum Novi Foederis, Leiden 1804.
- Compendii theologiae christianae ordo et argumentum, pars theoretica, Leiden, 1808, 3 volumes, 1827.
- Oratio de populari religione christiana disciplinae ex legitimae Sacrorum Librorum interpretationis fonte praecipue haurienda, Leiden 1809.
- Annotationum in loca selecta Novi Foederis tria specimina, Leiden, 1810–1812, 3 volumes.
- Oratio de commodis atque emolumentis quae e singulari Principium Europaeorum in religione christiana his temporibus proitenda, consensu, sperare et augurare liceat, Leiden 1817.
- Animadversiones de usu verborum cum praepositionibus comparativis in Novum Testamentum, Leiden 1818, 2 volumes, 1821.
- Annotatio ad J. Chrysostomi selecta Graece et Latine, cum praefatione et annotationibus, Leiden, 1827, 2 volumes, 1830.
- Oratio in memoriam beneficiorum Dei in mime re publico cum ecclesiastico turn academico, decem lustra feliciter gesto, in se collatorum solemniter celebravit, Leiden 1828.

=== in Dutch ===
- Over de dwaasheid van het scepticisme of der twijfelarij en de onbezonnenheid van het meesterachtig beslissen omtrent godsdienstige voorstellen, alsmede over den middenweg tusschen beide. In: Teyler's Verhandelingen, VII, Verhandelingen uitgegeeven door Teyler's tweede Genootschap. Zevende Stuk. Haarlem 1787.
- De allernauwste betrekking en zeer heilzaame invloed van het Geloof der Verborgenheden, en andere betwiste Leerstukken, op onze Gelukzaligheid betoogd. In: Prysverhandelingen van het Haagsche Genootschap tot verdeediging van den Christelijken Godsdienst, teegen deszelfs hedendaegsche Bestrijders 90, 1787.
- van Voorst, Joannes (1789). "Proeve over de egtheid en ongeschondenheid van Mattheus evangelie : en wel bijzonder over de eghtheid van Matth. XXVIII:19". Prijsverhandelingen van het Genootschap tot Verdediging van den Christelijken Godsdienst, voor het jaar 1788 (in Dutch). 's Haege (Den Haag), Amsterdam, Haarlem: J. du Mee en Zn. pp. 362–425. OCLC 65562367.
- Verhandeling ten betooge dat God eigenlijk gezegde straffen op de overtreding zijner wetten bedreigd heeft en dat Hij, als Rechter, de zonden dadelijk straft. In: Prysverhandelingen van het Haagsche Genootschap... 1794; Amsterdam-Den Haag 1796.
- Verhandeling over de koninglijke waardigheid en opperheerschappij van Jesus Christus. In: Verh. H.G. 1798, Amsterdam 1799.
- Over eenige grondstellingen, die bij de voortgezette verdediging van den christelijken godsdienst moesten vaststaan (...). In: Prysverhandelingen van het Haagsche Genootschap... 1811.
- Leerredenen bij bijzondere gelegenheden en eenige andere, Den Haag, 1819.
- Over de steeds voortdurende behoefte van regte bijbelkennis (...). In: Prysverhandelingen van het Haagsche Genootschap... 1819.
- Over de letterkundige verdiensten van Hugo de Groot, Amsterdam 1826.

== Memberships ==
- Haagsch Genootschap, as one of the directors, 1809 - 1833
- Koninklijk Instituut, derde klasse, Member: 22-02-1824.

== Literature ==
- van der Aa, Abraham Jacob (1876). "Johannes van Voorst". Biographisch Woordenboek der Nederlanden (in Dutch). Vol. 19. Haarlem: J. J. van Brederode. p. 356.
- Berkvens-Stevelinck, Christiane (2012). Magna commoditas : Leiden University's great asset : 425 years library collections and services. Translated by UvA Talen, Amsterdam. Leiden: Leiden University Press. pp. 161–165, 187, 189. ISBN 9789087281656. OCLC 794706996.
- Blok, P.J.; Molhuysen, P.C., eds. (1933). "[Voorst, Johannes van]". Nieuw Nederlandsch Biografisch Woordenboek (in Dutch). Vol. 9.
- Fournier, W. J. (1983). "Voorst, Johannes van". Biografisch Lexicon voor de geschiedenis van het Nederlands Protestantisme. Vol. 2. Kampen: J. H. Kok. p. 449. ISBN 90-242-2332-6.
- Glasius, Barend (1856). Biographisch Woordenboek van Nederlandsche Godgeleerden (in Dutch). Vol. 3. ’s-Hertogenbosch: Gebr. Muller. p. 544.
- van Hengel, Wessel Albertus (1834). Memoria Ioannis van Voorst, Theologiae Doctoris et Professoris in Academia Lugduno-Batava (in Latin). Leiden: S. et J. Luchtmans.
