= Dutch University Libraries and National Library =

Dutch academic library association

UKB
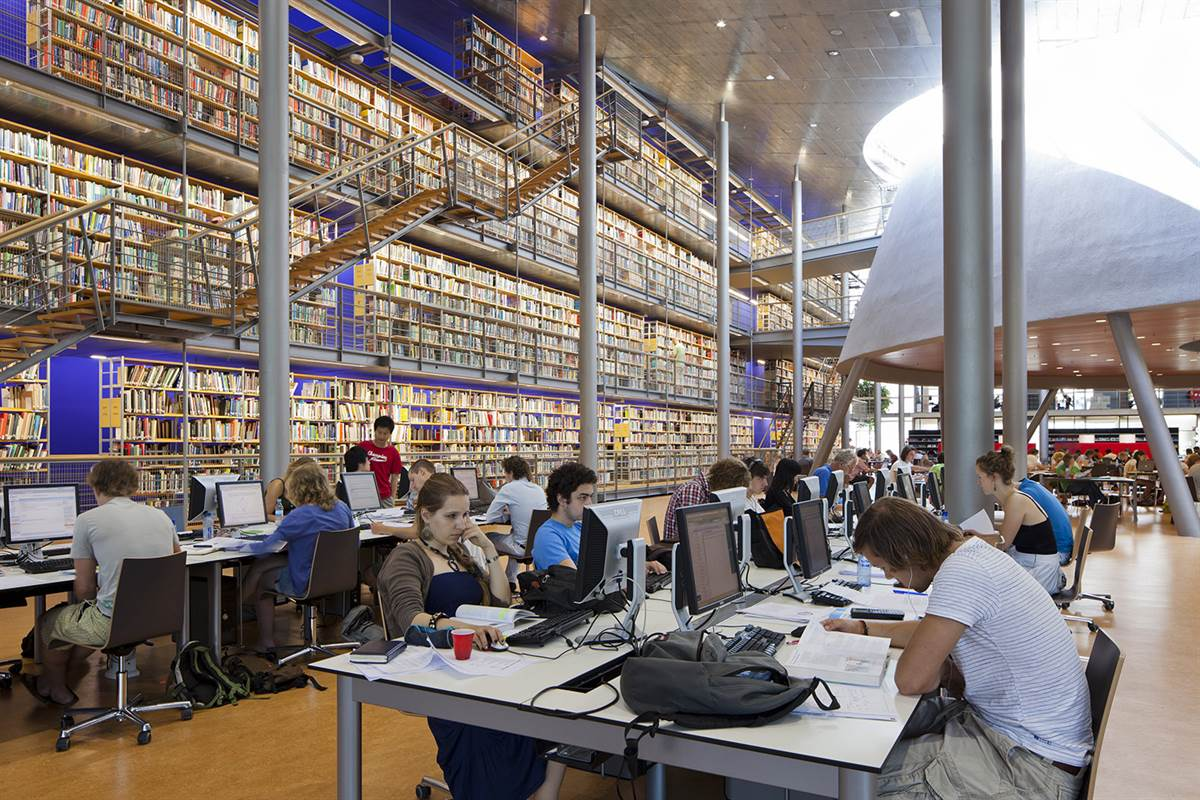
- Delft University of Technology Library, 2015. Member of UKB.
- Established: 1979; 47 years ago
- Type: Non-profit academic national library association
- Headquarters: Utrecht, the Netherlands
- Members: 17
- Website: UKB

UKB refers to the association of thirteen Dutch university libraries and Royal Library of the Netherlands (Koninklijke Bibliotheek, KB). Furthermore, associate members are Royal Netherlands Academy of Arts and Sciences (KNAW), the Open Universiteit, Dutch Research Council (Nederlandse Organisatie voor Wetenschappelijk Onderzoek NWO), and the Dutch Werkgroep Speciale Wetenschappelijke Bibliotheken (Special Scientific Libraries Working Group, WSWB). UKB was founded in 1979 to improve the scientific information structure and knowledge cooperation between academic libraries in the Netherlands and internationally.

The collaborating libraries could effect synergetic efficiency gains by, e.g., collective licensing negotiations with international publishers.

== University members ==
UKB members include the libraries of the classical universities, alphabetically Delft University of Technology, Eindhoven University of Technology, Erasmus University Rotterdam, Leiden University, Maastricht University, Open University in the Netherlands, Radboud University, Tilburg University, University of Groningen, University of Twente, Utrecht University, University of Amsterdam, Vrije Universiteit Amsterdam, Wageningen University and Research Centre, and as associate member Open University of the Netherlands.
