= Jacob Geel =

Dutch scholar, critic and librarian

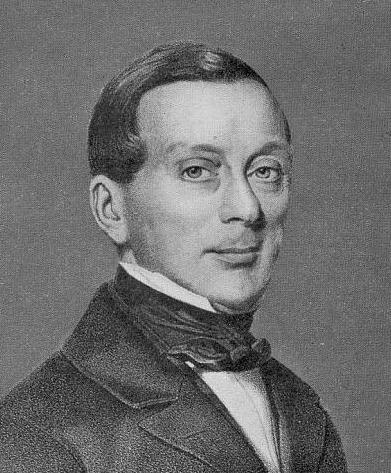
Jacob Geel

Jacob Geel (12 November 1789 – 11 November 1862) was a Dutch scholar, critic and librarian.

He was born in Amsterdam. In 1823 he was appointed as a librarian, and in 1833 as university librarian and honorary professor at Leiden University, where he remained until his death. Geel materially contributed to the development of classical studies in the Netherlands. He was the author of editions of Theocritus (1820), of the Vatican fragments of Polybius (1829), of the Olympikos of Dio Chrysostom (1840) and of numerous essays in the Rheinisches Museum and Bibliotheca critica nova, of which he was one of the founders. He also compiled a valuable catalogue of the manuscripts in Leiden University Library, wrote a history of the Greek sophists, and translated various German works into Dutch.

In 1825 he became member of the Royal Institute of the Netherlands.

== Publications (selection) ==
- Jacob Geel: Gesprek op den Drachenfels (1835)
- Laurence Sterne: Sentimenteele reis door Frankrijk en Italië (uit het Engelsch vertaald door Jacob Geel) (1837)
- Jacob Geel: Onderzoek en phantasie (1838). [9th pr.] 2012, ed. by Willem van den Berg and Piet Gerbrandy, ISBN 978-90-8704-267-7
- Jacob Geel (ed.): Catalogus librorum bibliothecae publicae Universitatis Lugduno Batavae annis 1814–1847 illatorum (1848)
- Jacob Geel (ed.): Catalogus librorum manuscriptorum qui inde ab anno 1741 bibliothecae Lugduno Batavae accesserunt (1852)
