= Frans Kellendonk =

Dutch novelist (1951–1990)

- Born: Franciscus Gerardus Petrus Kellendonk; 7 January 1951; Nijmegen, Netherlands
- Died: 15 February 1990 (aged 39); Amsterdam, Netherlands
- Occupations: Novelist; translator
- Years active: 1974–1990

Franciscus Gerardus Petrus "Frans" Kellendonk (7 January 1951 – 15 February 1990) was a Dutch novelist, writer and translator.

In 1987 he won the Ferdinand Bordewijk Prijs for his novel Mystiek lichaam (Mystical Body).

Some of his writing was seen as controversial.

His literary archive and personal papers are part of the archive collection of Leiden University.

== The Frans Kellendonk Prize ==
His name is given to the annual literary Frans Kellendonk Prize. Recipients include:

- Arnon Grunberg, 2010.
- Esther Gerritsen, 2014.
- Hanna Bervoets, 2017.
- Joost de Vries, 2023.

== Publication ==
- Franciscus Gerardus Petrus Kellendonk: John & Richard Marriott. The history of a seventeenth-century publishing house. Amsterdam, 1978. (Dissertation Katholieke Universiteit Nijmegen). ISBN 90-253-5535-8
- Bouwval (Ruin, 1977).
- Mystiek lichaam (Mystical Body, 1986).
