= Jan Cornelisz. van 't Woudt =

Dutch printmaker and painter (c. 1580–1615)

Jan Cornelisz. van 't Woudt / Woudanus
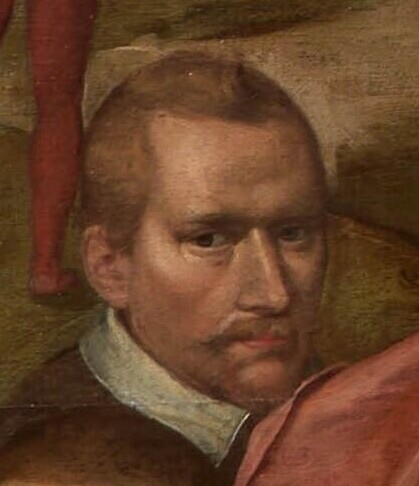
- Self portrait on his De overgave van Weinsberg, 1603 (The Surrender of Weinsberg, 1603)
- Born: circa 1565 presumably 't Woudt near Delft
- Died: 1615-02-07 (burial); Leiden
- Education: Taught by Jacob Willemsz Delff the Elder
- Spouse: Aechte Mattheusdr. van Eyck
- Parents: Cornelis Bartholomeusz. (father); Josyna Jansdr. (mother)

Jan Cornelisz. van 't Woudt (also Jan Cornelisz. van 't Woudt, Jan Woudanus, Jan Cornelisz. van 't Wout etc., born c. 1565 or c. 1570 near Delft, buried 7 February 1615 in Leiden) was a Dutch printmaker, painter, draughtsman and scientific illustrator who worked in Delft and Leiden.

== Biography ==
Woudanus worked as an artist in both Delft (1570 - 1594) and Leiden (1594 - 1615). He was a pupil of the painter Jacob Willemsz. Delff the Elder and was later the teacher of Aryen Poten from Delft.

== Work ==
Woudanus' work includes:

=== Paintings ===
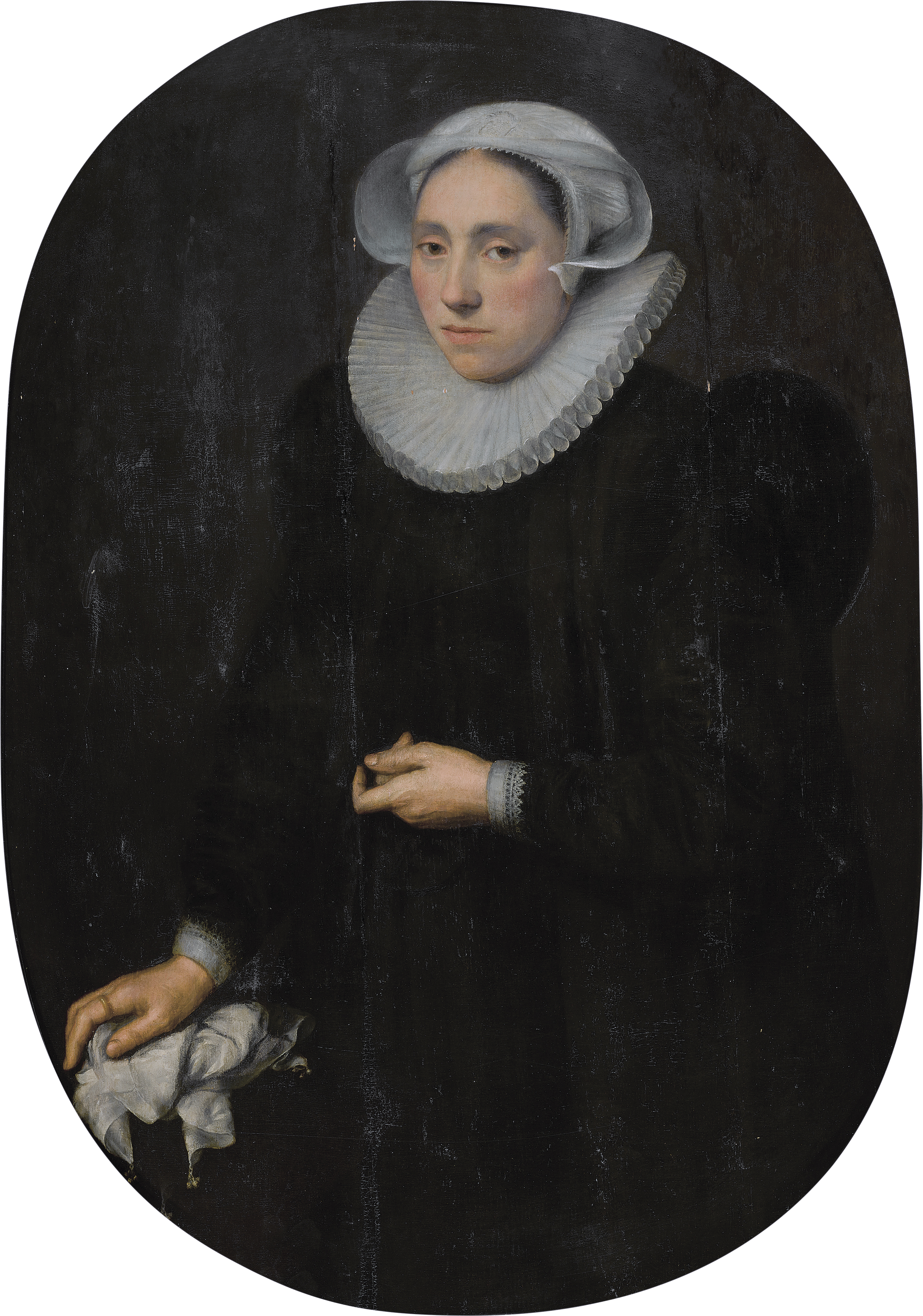
Portrait of a lady. Oil on panel, 1601 - 1609.

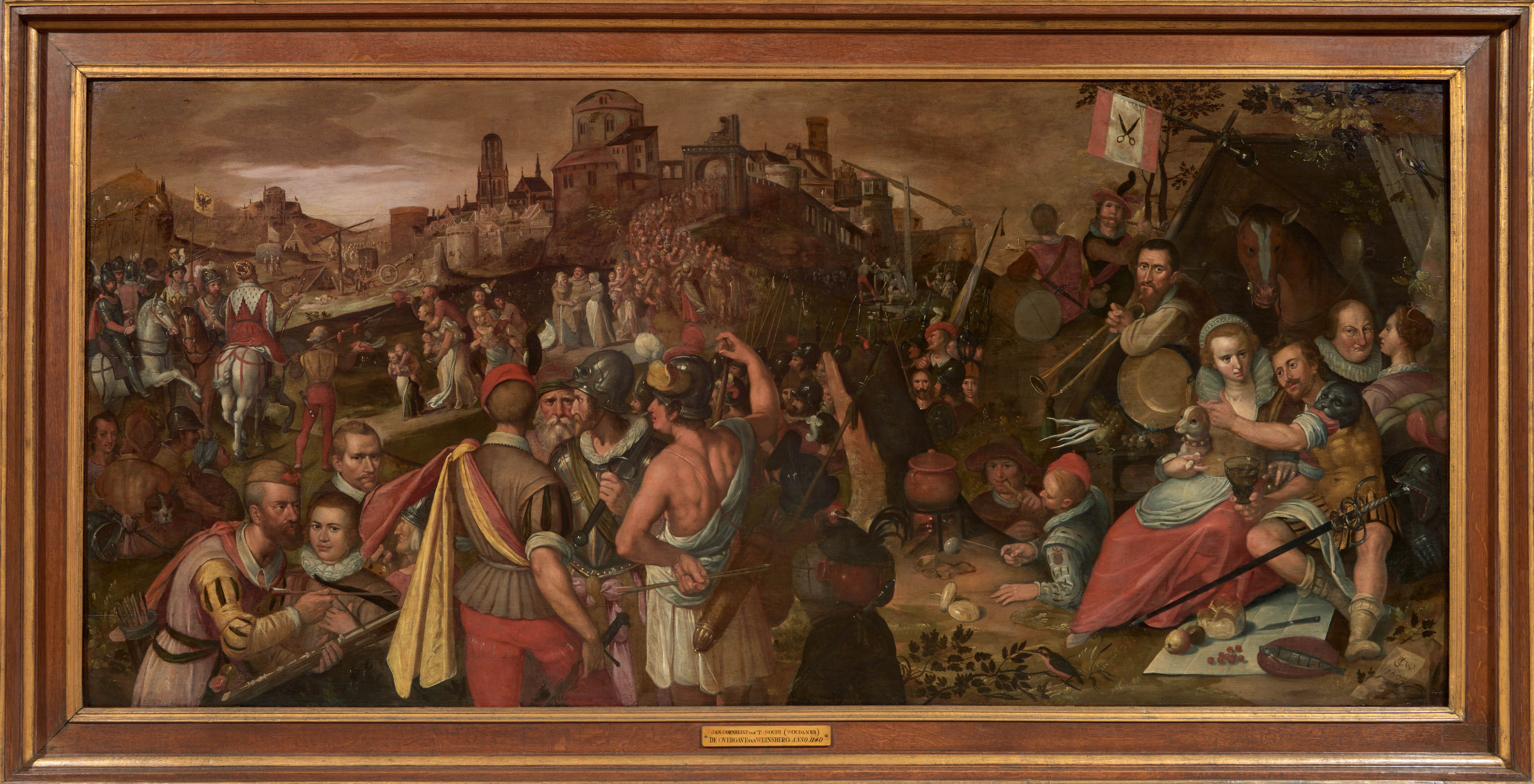
The surrender of Weinsberg (Dutch: De overgave van Weinsberg), 1603.

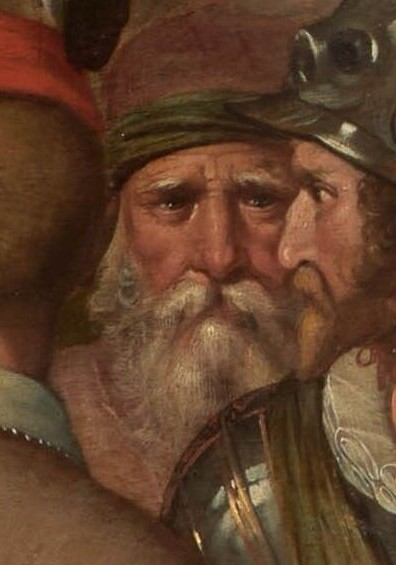
Portrait of Dirck Volckertszoon Coornhert, detail of The surrender of Weinsberg.

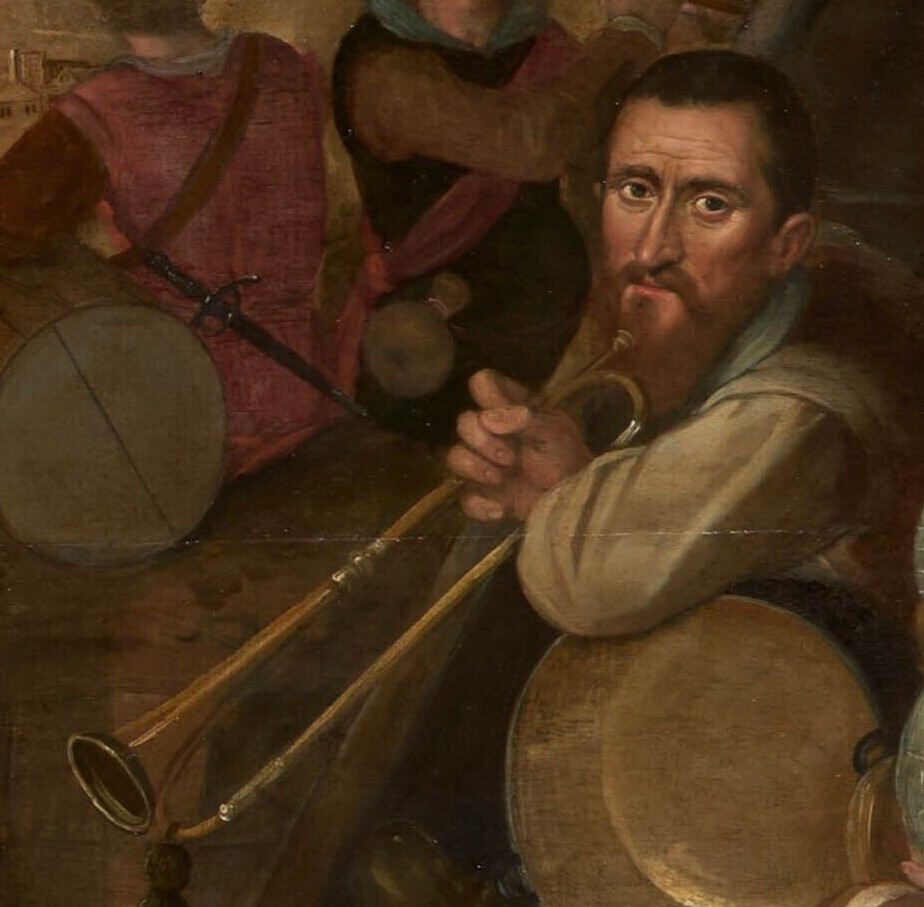
Portrait of Jacob Duym, detail of The surrender of Weinsberg.

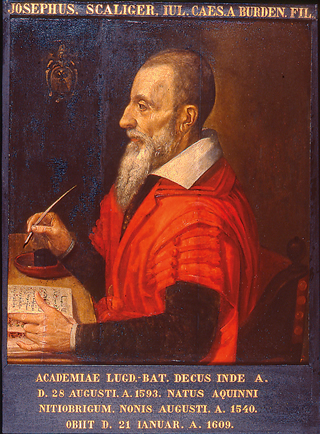
Portrait of Joseph Justus Scaliger (1540–1609). Oil on panel, 1608.

=== Prints ===
Prints after drawings by Jan Cornelisz. van 't Woudt, four on Leiden University by printmaker Willem Isaacsz. van Swanenburg and one by printmaker Willem Jacobsz. Delff

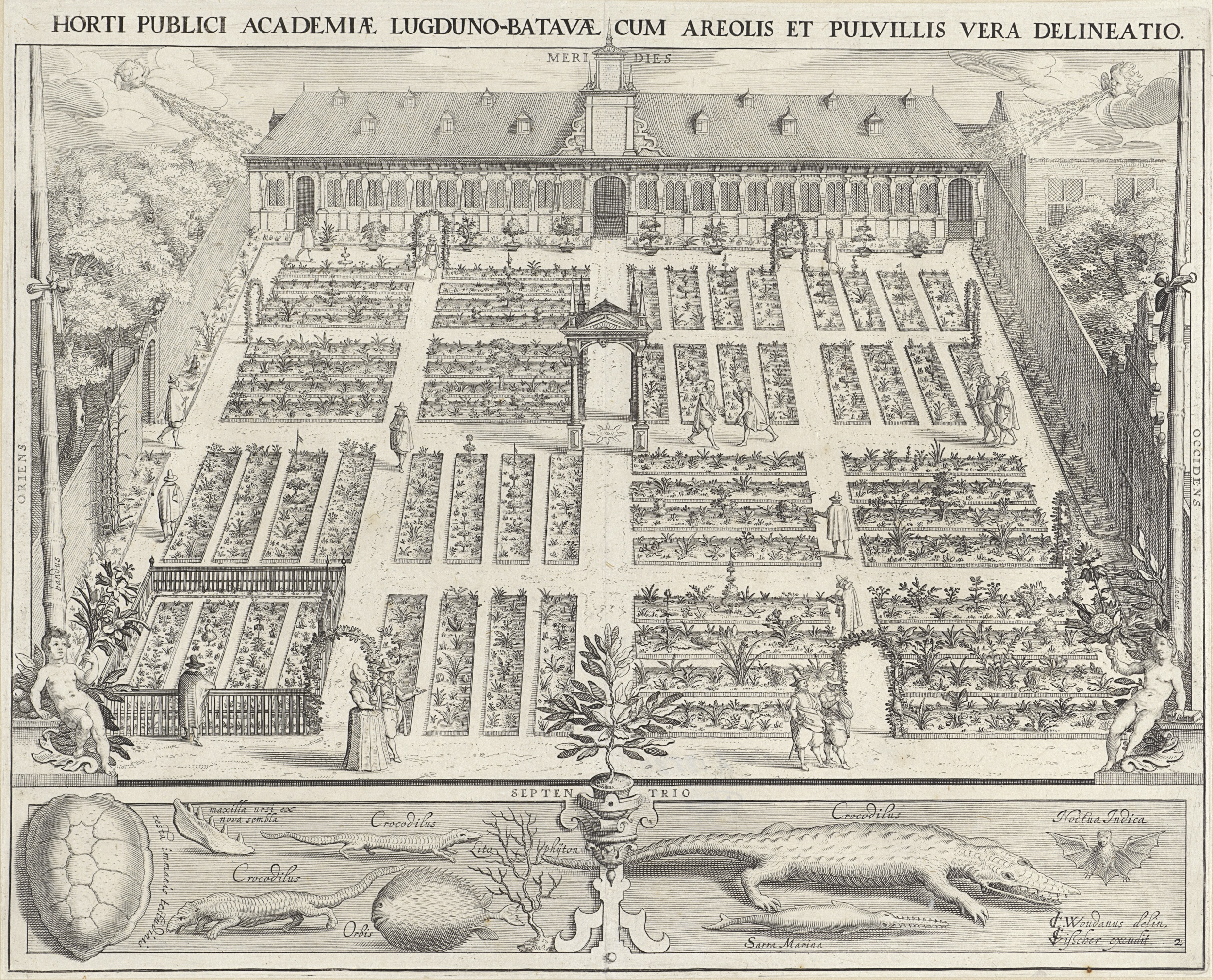
Leiden University Hortus Botanicus, 1610 or 1644.

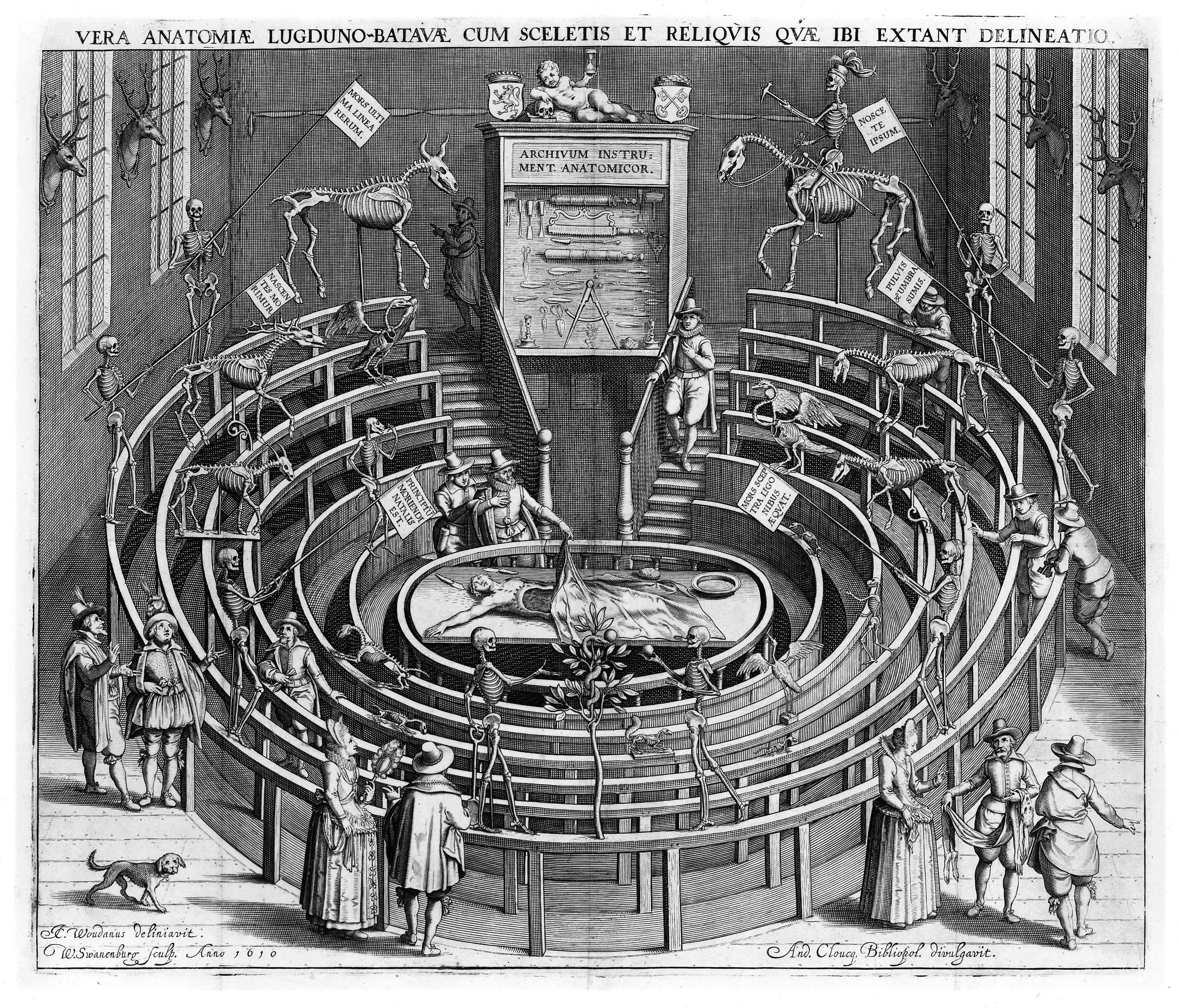
Leiden University anatomical theatre, 1610.

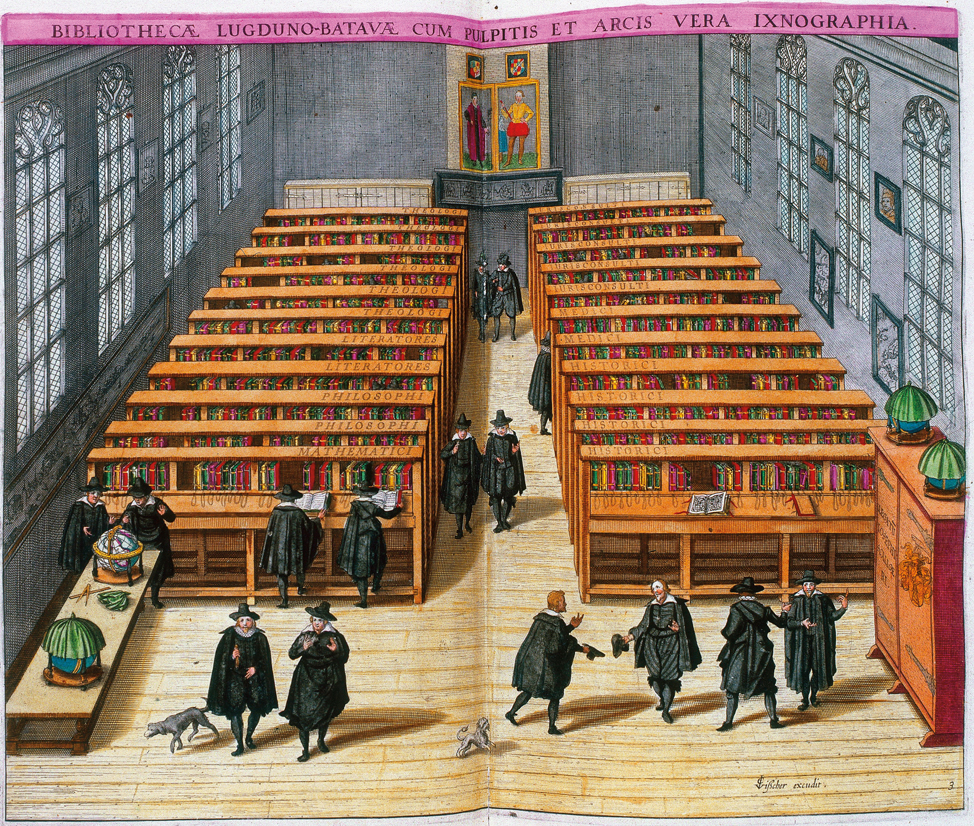
Leiden University Library, 1610.

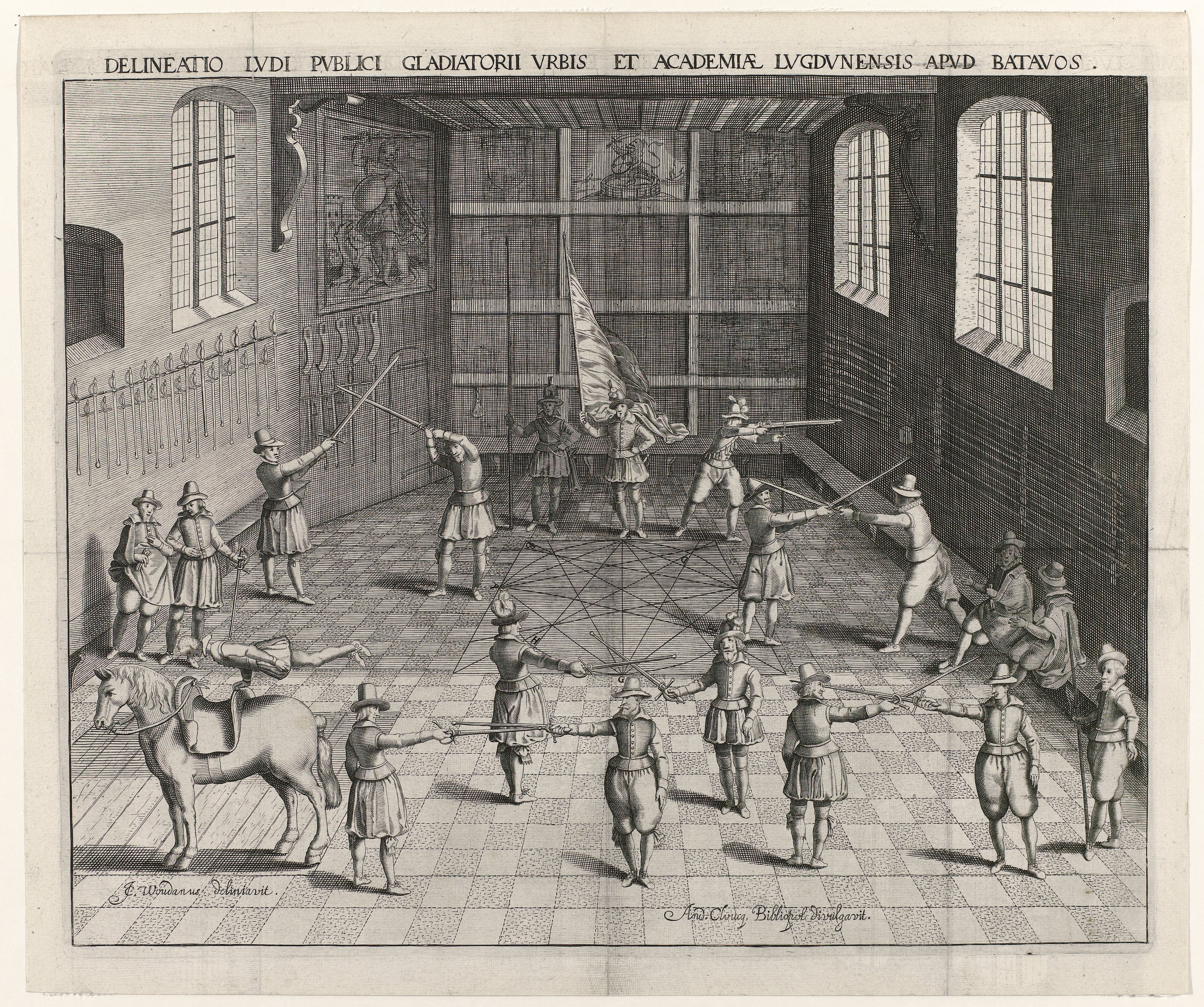
Leiden University fencing school, undated.

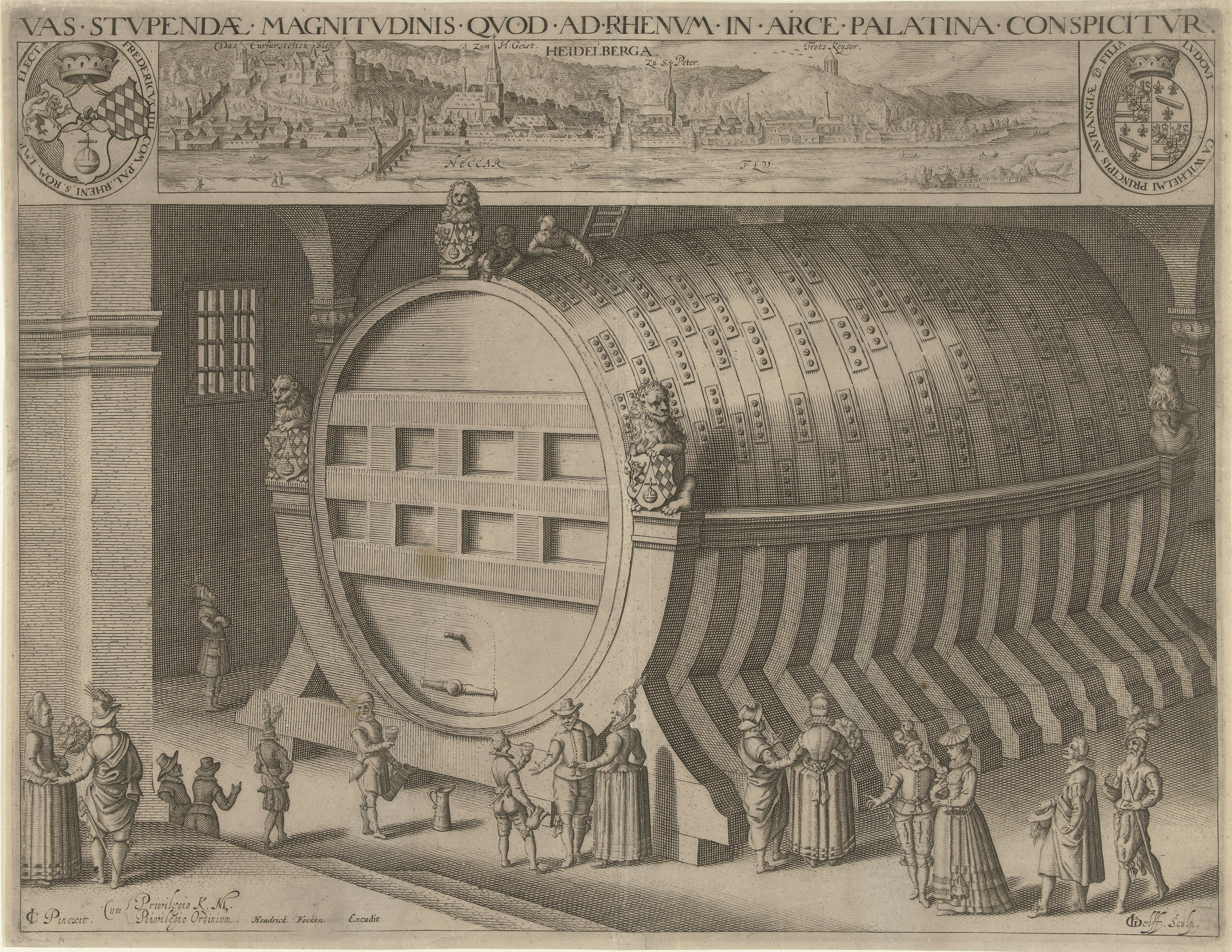
Heidelberg Wine Barrel, Johann-Casimir-Fass. "IC" stands for Jan Cornelisz. (van 't Woudt).

== Further literature ==
- van Maris, Corrie (30 May 2024). Vermeerderd en verrijkt: de eerste gravures van de Leidse universiteit naar Jan Cornelisz. van 't Woudt beschouwd vanuit een stedelijke context 1609-1716 [Expanded and enriched: the first engravings of Leiden University after Jan Cornelisz. van 't Woudt viewed from an urban context 1609-1716.]. scholarlypublications.universiteitleiden.nl (PhD thesis) (in Dutch). Full-text PDF download.
- Hollstein, F. W. H.; de Scheemaker, Jeroen; Schuckman, Christiaan (1999). "Jan Cornelisz. van 't Woudt". In de Hoop Scheffer, Dieuwke (ed.). Gaspar Adriaensz. van Wittel to Moyses van Wtenbrouck. Hollstein's Dutch & Flemish Etchings, Engravings and Woodcuts ca. 1450 - 1700. Vol. LIV (54). ISBN 978-90-75607-39-0. OCLC 992147655. 278 pages.
