= Portrait of Maurice, Prince of Orange =

1610s painting by Michiel van Mierevelt

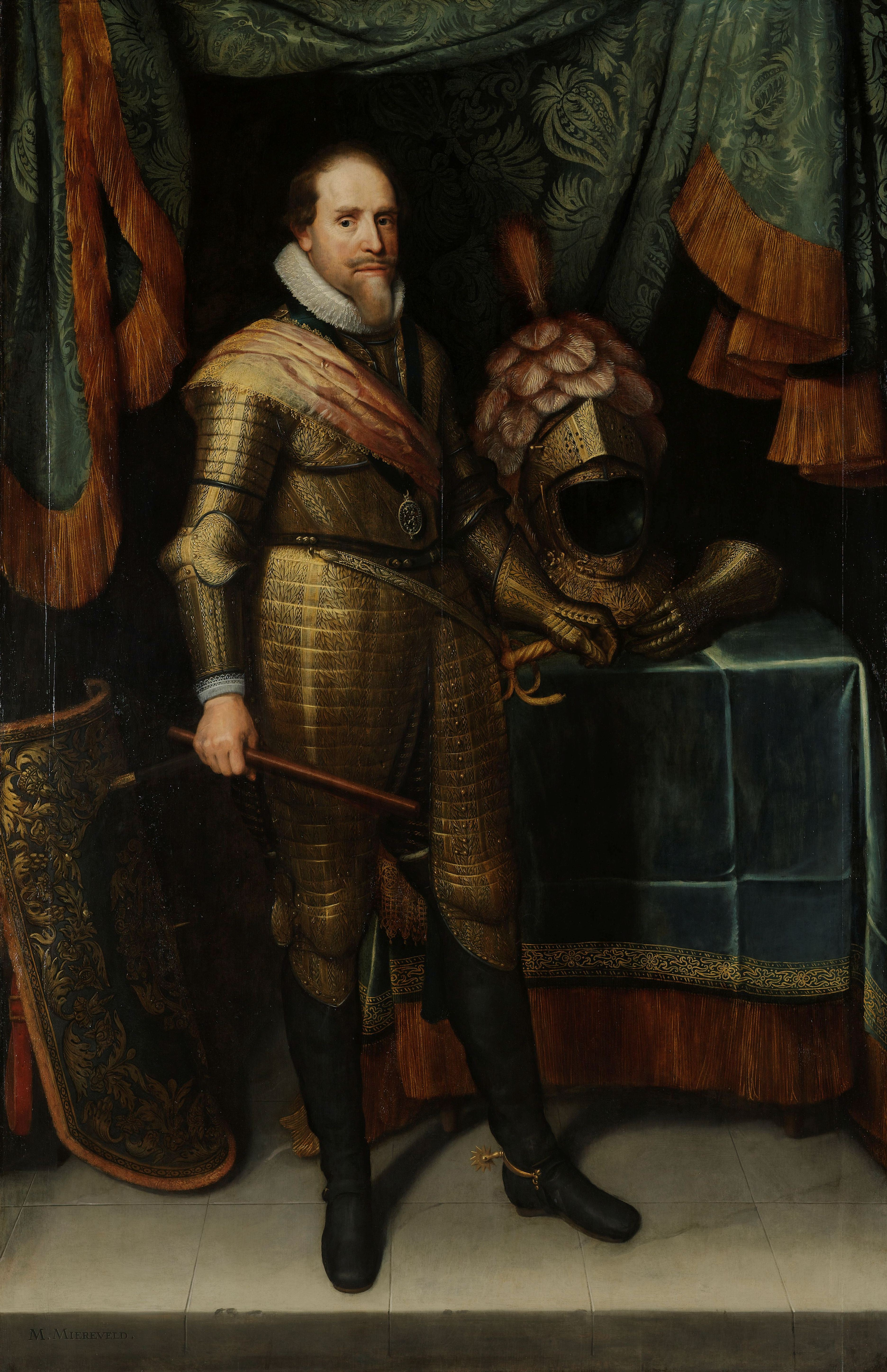
- Artist: Michiel Jansz van Mierevelt
- Year: between 1613 and 1620
- Medium: oil on panel
- Dimensions: 220,3 cm × 143,5 cm (867 in × 565 in)
- Location: Rijksmuseum, Amsterdam

Portrait of Maurice, Prince of Orange is an oil on panel portrait produced sometime between 1613 and 1620 by Michiel van Mierevelt. It shows Maurice, Prince of Orange. It was commissioned by the States General of the Netherlands. According to an English traveller, it was hanging in the assembly room of the States General in 1707.

Maurice wears a gilded armour awarded to him by the States General after his victory at the Battle of Nieuwpoort – the armour itself has not survived but was probably made by the armourer and goldsmith Charles Dartené. A similar armour known to have been made by "Maurice's armourer" for Henry Frederick, Prince of Wales remains part of the Royal Armouries collection and is displayed in the Tower of London.

== Sources ==
- Portrait of Maurice, Prince of Orange in the Rijksmuseum
