= Hortus Botanicus Leiden =

Botanical garden in the Netherlands

Hortus Botanicus
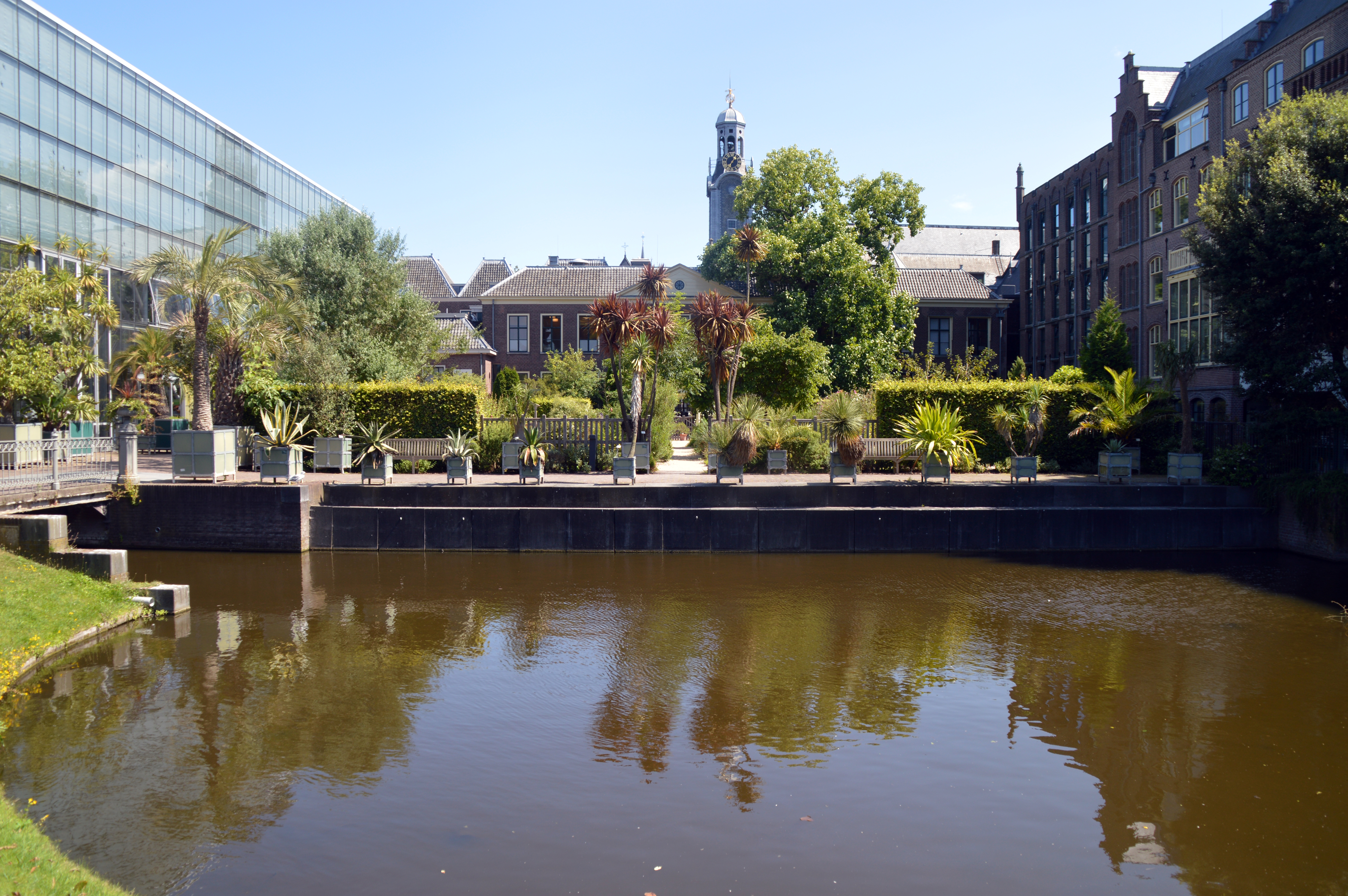
- Hortus botanicus Leiden viewed from the west, with the main university building with its tower in the rear, 2024.

- Location within the province of South Holland
- Established: 1590
- Location: Rapenburg 73, 2311 GJ Leiden, Netherlands
- Coordinates: 52.157094°N 4.484522°E
- Type: botanic garden
- Visitors: 255.891 (2024)
- Website: www.hortus.leidenuniv.nl/en/

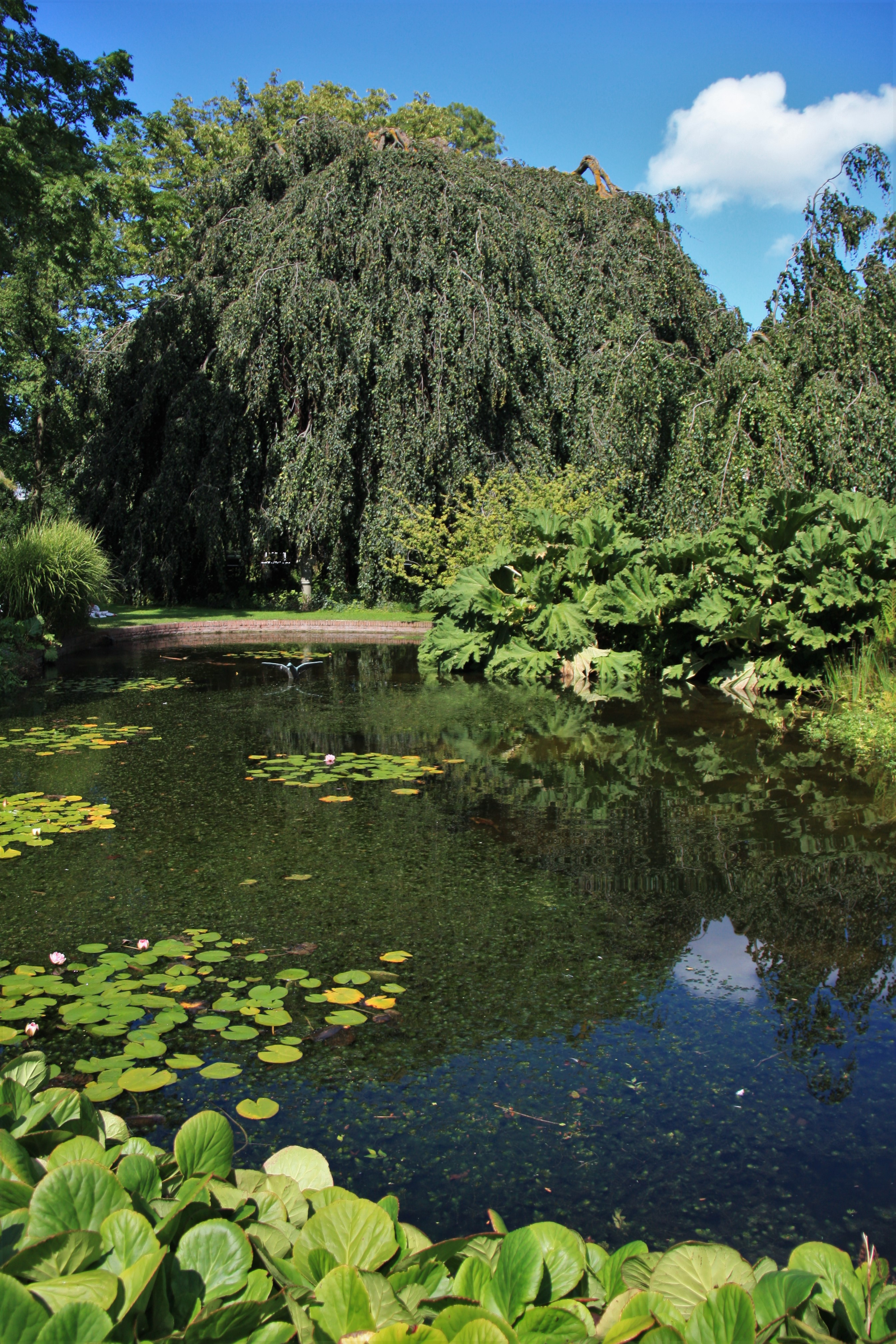
A pond at the Hortus Botanicus, 2015.

The Hortus botanicus of Leiden is the oldest botanical garden of the Netherlands, and one of the oldest in the world. It is located in the southwestern part of the historical centre of the city, between the Academy building and the old Leiden Observatory building.

== History ==
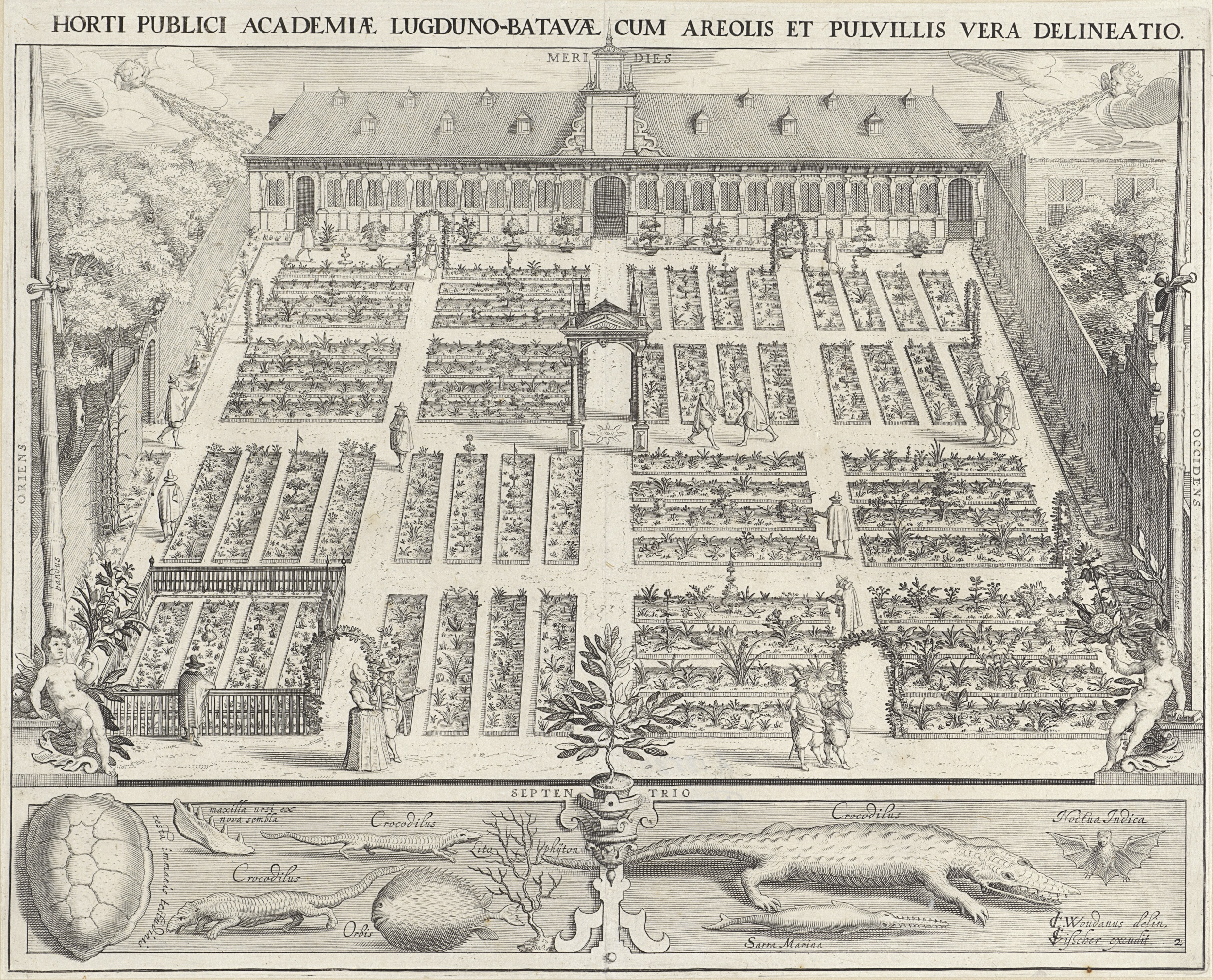
Hortus Botanicus Leiden in 1610. Print by Jan Cornelisz. Woudanus and Willem Isaacsz. van Swanenburg.

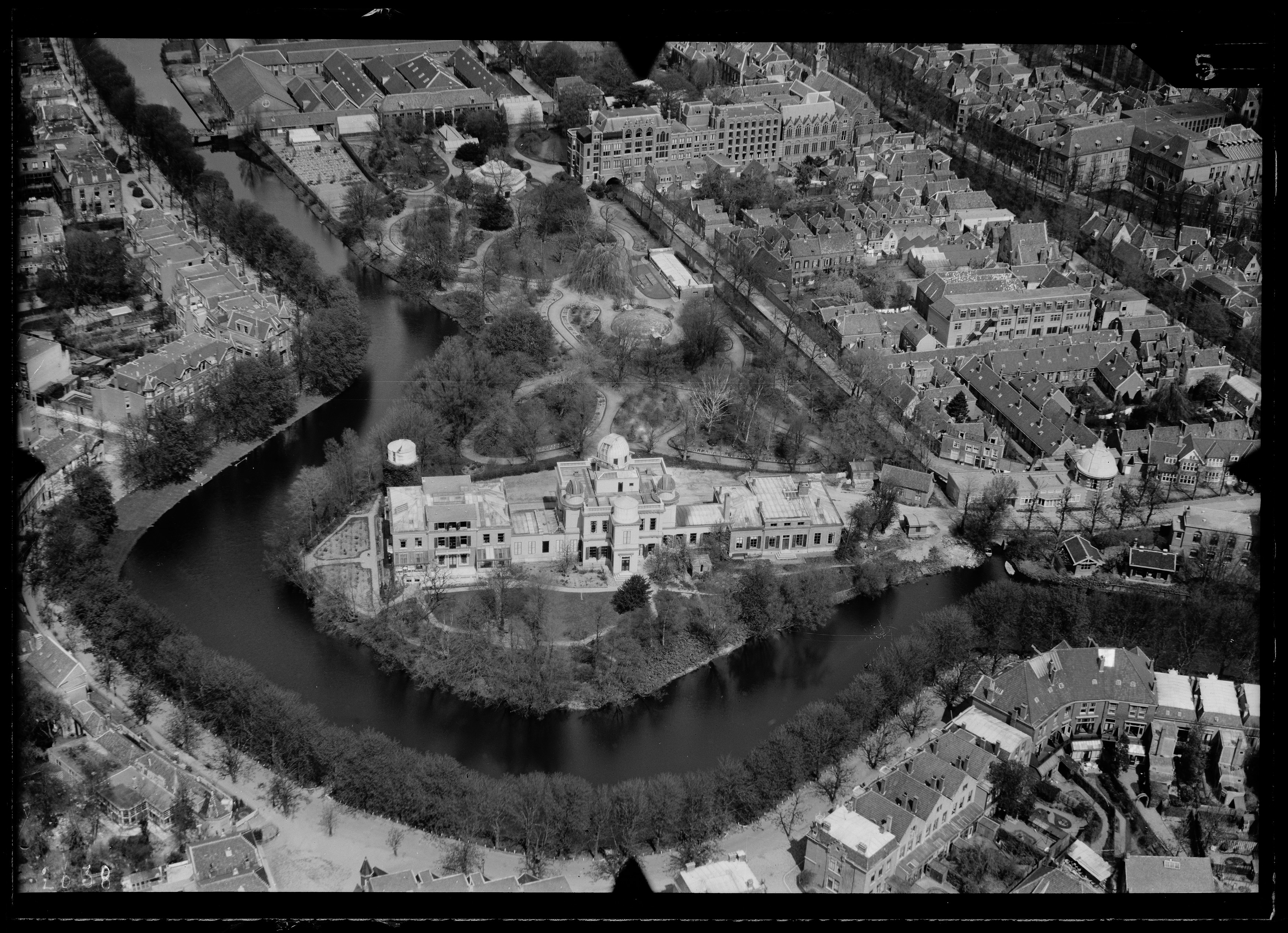
Hortus Botanicus (behind Observatory), ca. 1920-1940.

In 1587 the young University of Leiden asked for permission from the mayor of Leiden to establish a hortus academicus behind the university building, for the benefit of the medical students. The request was granted in 1590, and the famous botanist Carolus Clusius (1526–1609) was appointed as prefect. Clusius arrived in Leiden in 1593. His knowledge, reputation, and international contacts allowed him to set up a very extensive plant collection. Clusius also urged the Dutch East India Company (VOC) to collect plants and (dried) plant specimens in the colonies. The original garden set up by Clusius was small (about 35 by 40 meters), but contained more than 1000 different plants.

The collecting of tropical (from the Indies) and sub-tropical (from the Cape Colony) plants was continued under Clusius' successors. Especially Herman Boerhaave (1668–1738, prefect from 1709 to 1730), contributed greatly to the fame of the Hortus with his efforts to collect new plants and specimens, and with his publications, such as a catalog of the plants then to be found in the Hortus.

Another major contribution to the collections was made by Philipp Franz von Siebold, a German physician who was employed on Deshima (Japan) by the VOC from 1823 until his expulsion by Japan in 1829. During that period he collected many dried and living plants from all over Japan (as well as animals, ethnographical objects, maps, etc.), and sent them to Leiden.

The first greenhouses appeared in the Hortus in the second half of the 17th century, the monumental Orangery was built between 1740 and 1744. From its original plan the Hortus was expanded in 1736 by Adriaan van Royen and Carl Linnaeus, and in 1817 by Theodor Friedrich Ludwig Nees von Esenbeck and Sebald Justinus Brugmans. In 1857, a part was used for building the new Leiden Observatory.

== Collection ==
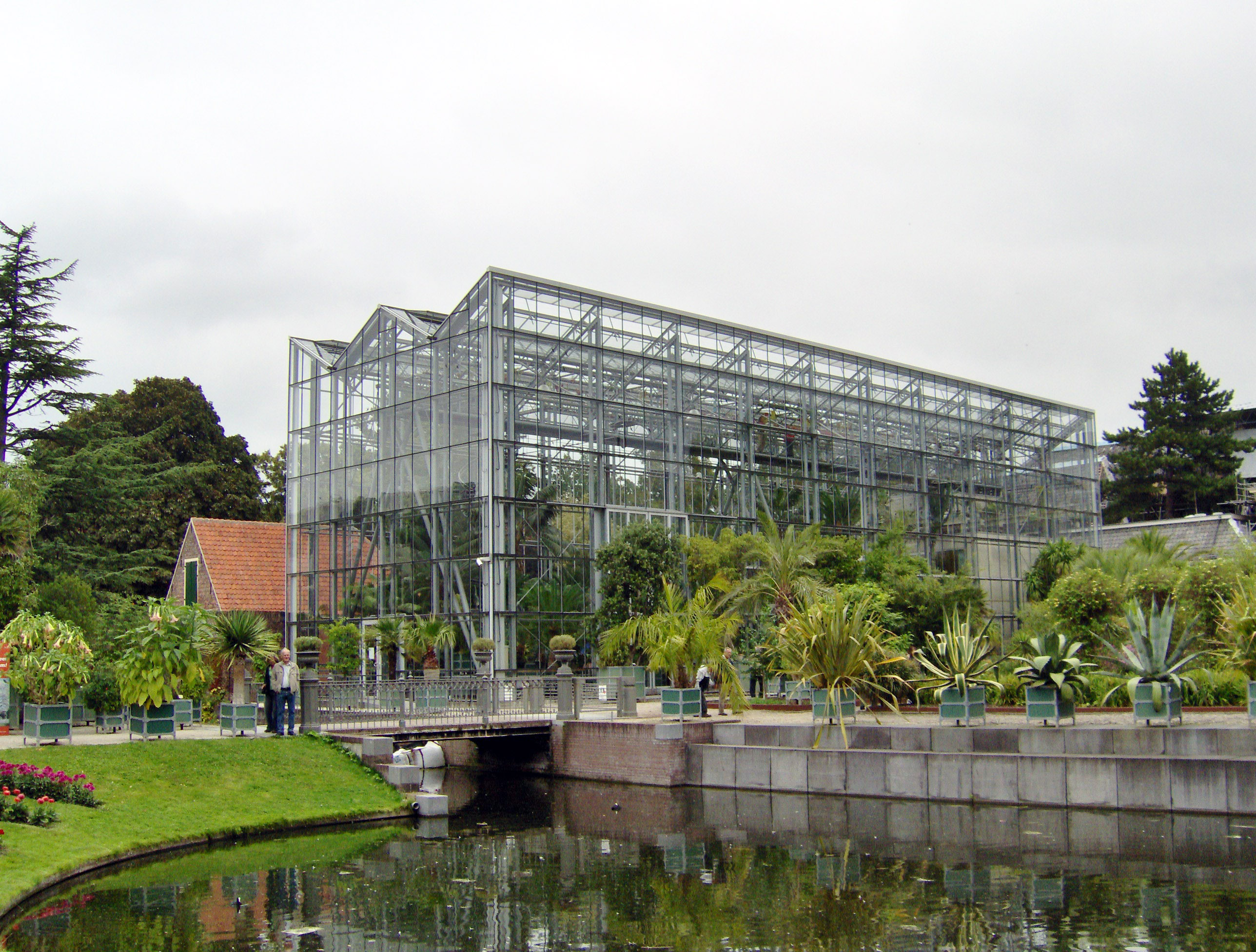
Winter garden, 2008.

From a historical perspective, the old Tuliptree (Liriodendron tulipifera) from 1716, Date plum (Diospyros lotus) from 1739, Ginkgo (Ginkgo biloba) from 1785 and Golden Chain (Laburnum anagyroides) from 1725 to 1818, are worth mentioning.

The greenhouses with Victoria amazonica and other tropical plants, and the large collection of sub-tropical plants in the recently renovated Orangery and the new Winter Garden draw many visitors. The park itself is an oasis inside the old city, with many more interesting plants and trees.

A Japanese garden in honour of Von Siebold opened in 1990. A reconstruction of Clusius' original garden, based on a plant list dating from the end of the 16th century, was opened in 2009.

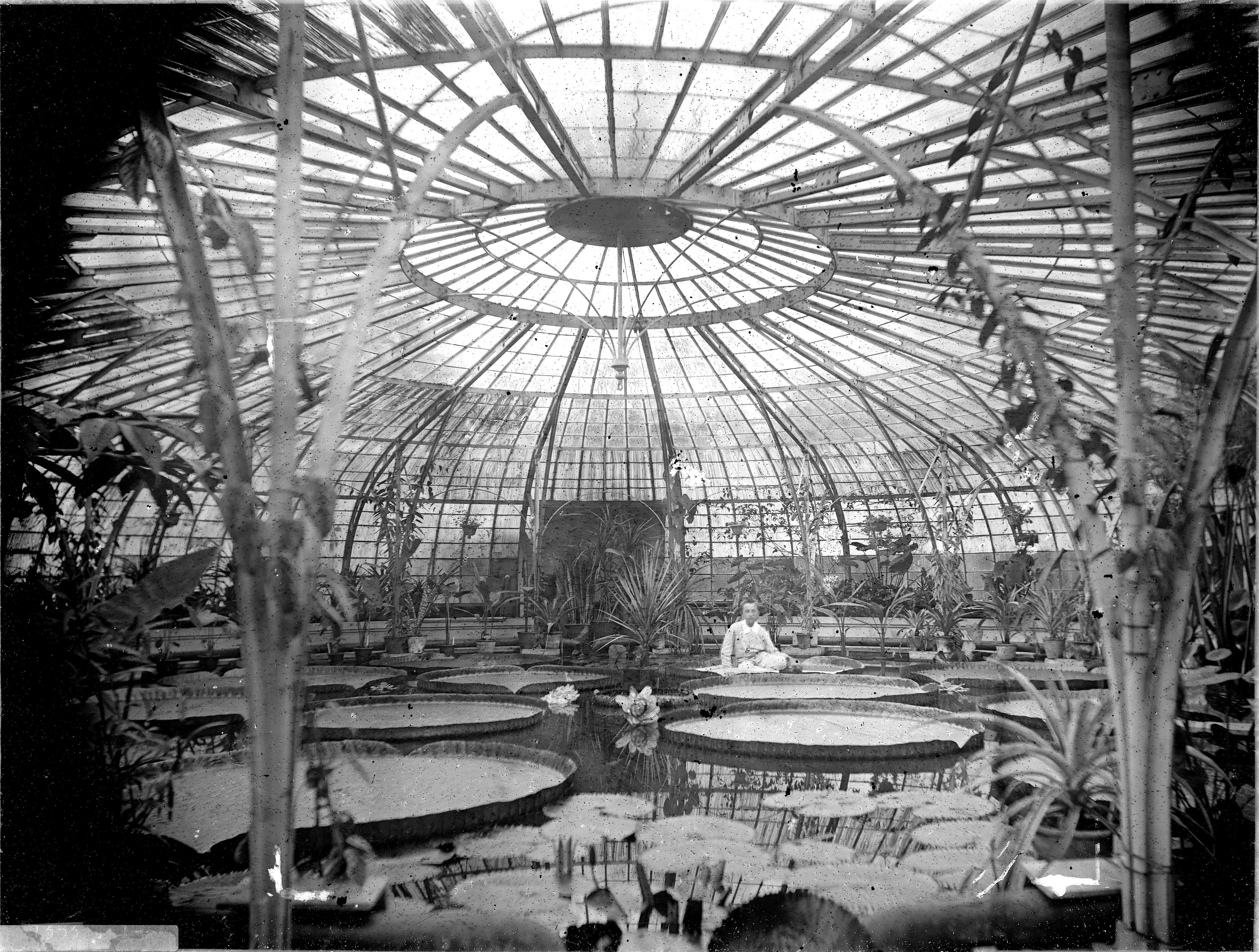
Jan Goedeljee: Greenhouse of the Hortus Botanicus with Victoria amazonica (Victoria regia). End of the 19th century.

From a scientific point of view, the Leiden Hortus is known for its collections of Asian Araceae (among which the Giant Arum Amorphophallus titanum), Hoya, Dischidia, Nepenthes, ferns and one of the biggest collections of Asian orchids in the world.

== Gallery ==
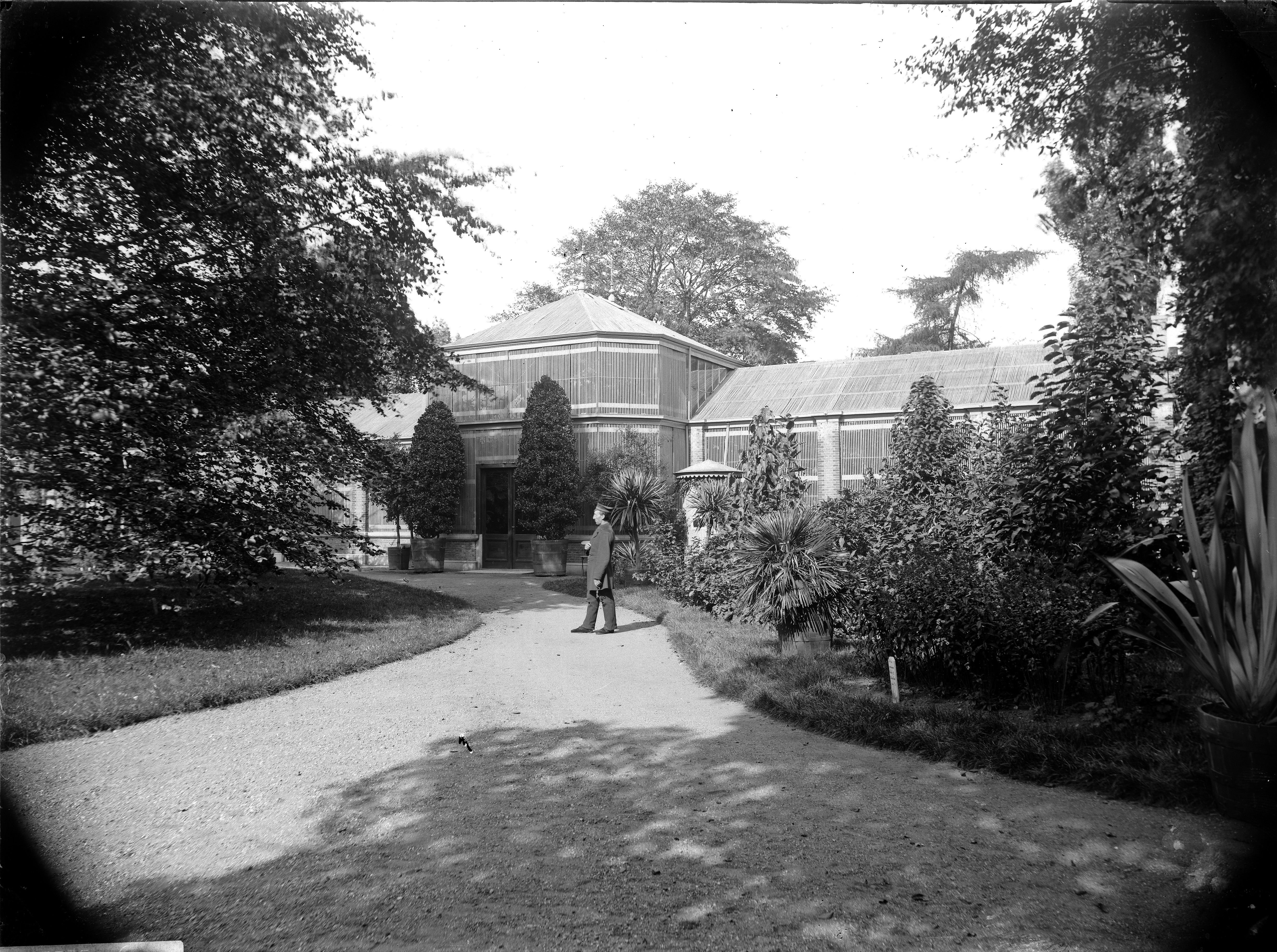
Jan Goedeljee: Greenhouse 1890-1900.

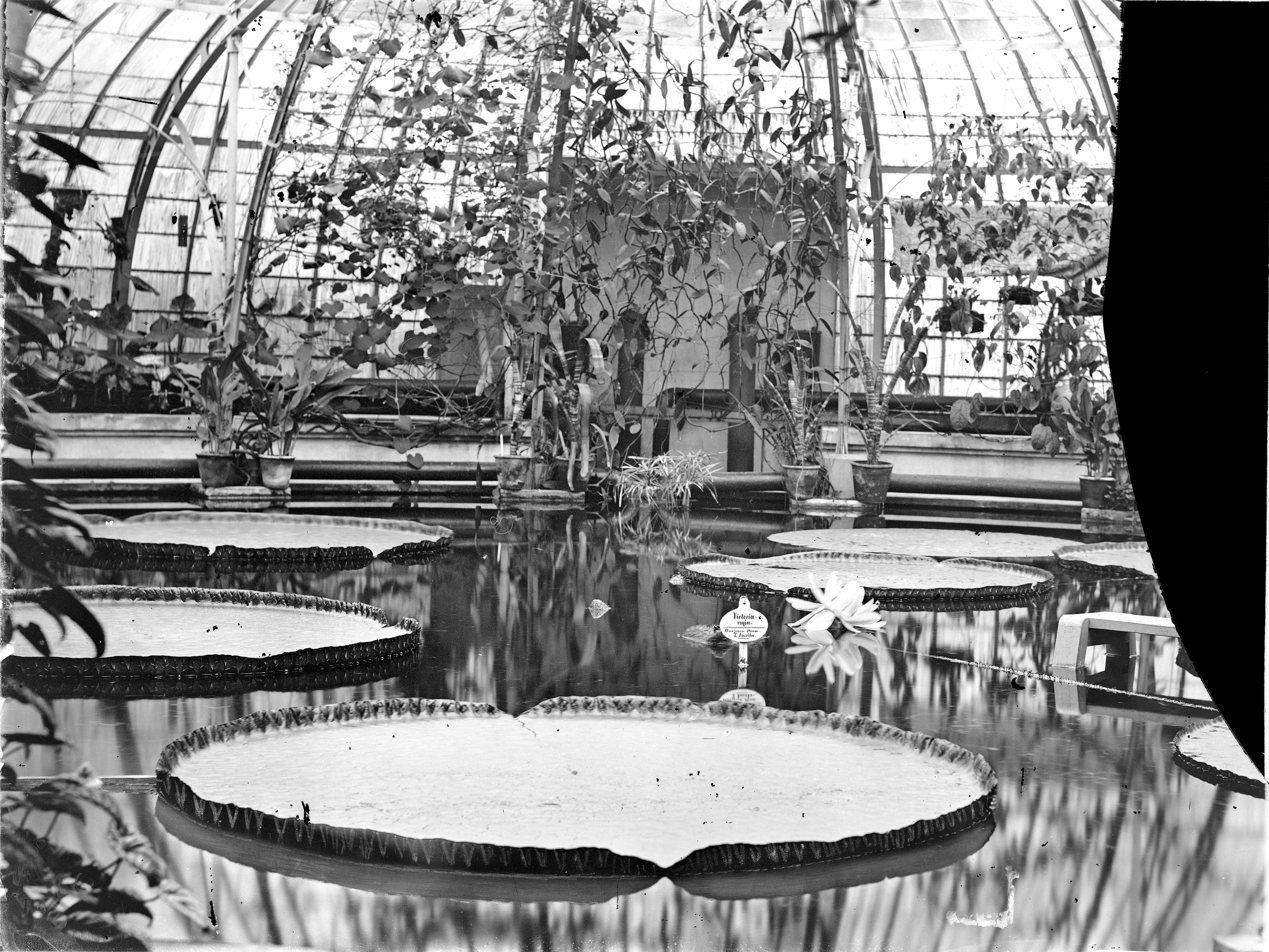
Jan Goedeljee: Victoria amazonica in bloom. End of the 19th century.
