= Jan Willemsz. van der Wilde =

Dutch Golden Age painter

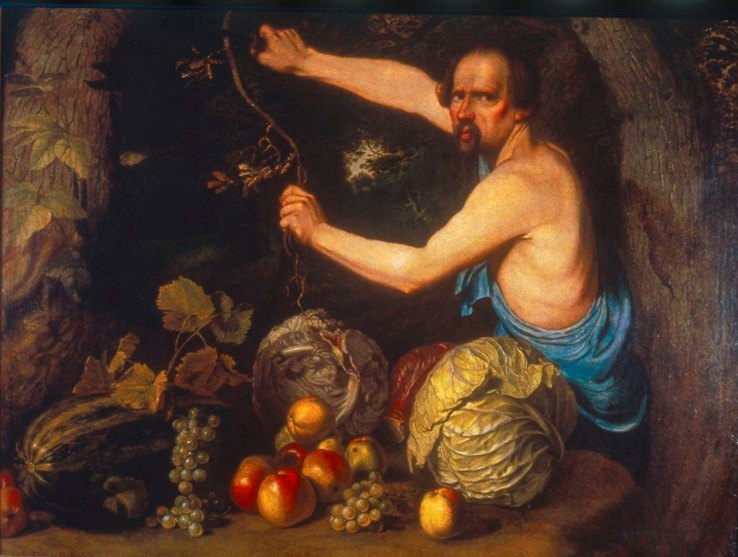
Image of Jan Willemsz

Jan Willemszoon van der Wilde (1586, Leiden – 1636, Leeuwarden), was a Dutch Golden Age painter.

== Biography ==
According to Houbraken he was a good portrait painter and a contemporary of Wybrand de Geest.

According to the RKD he was influenced by Cornelis Jacobsz Delff. He is known both for portraits and still life paintings. In 1617 he married Sytske Joostedr in Leeuwarden, the widow of Simon Fredrix.
