= Cornelis Jacobsz Delff =

Dutch Golden Age painter

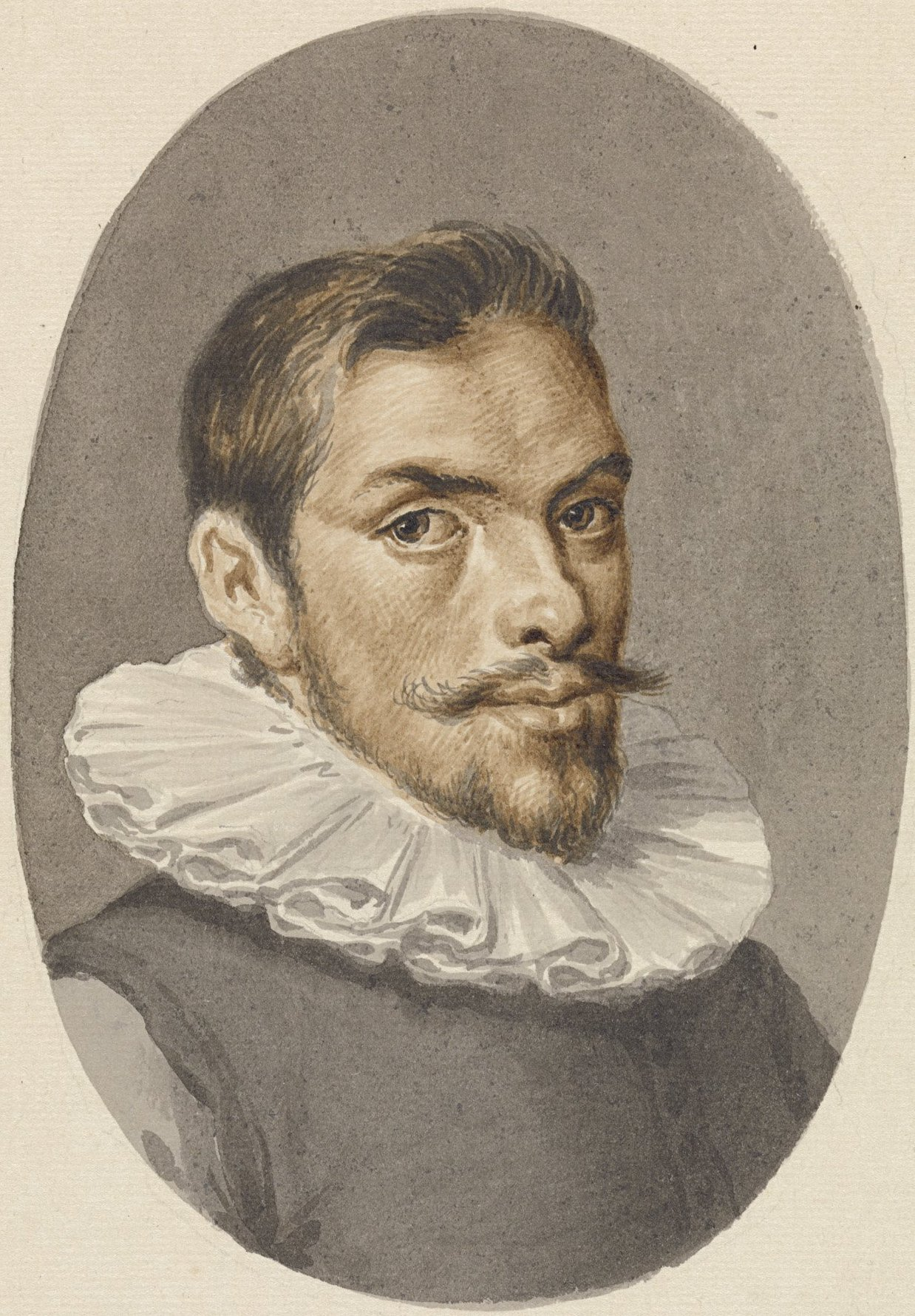
Portrait of Cornelis Jacobsz Delff by Tako Hajo Jelgersma after Jacob Willemsz Delff

Cornelis Jacobsz. Delff (1570–1643) was a Dutch Golden Age still life painter.

== Biography ==
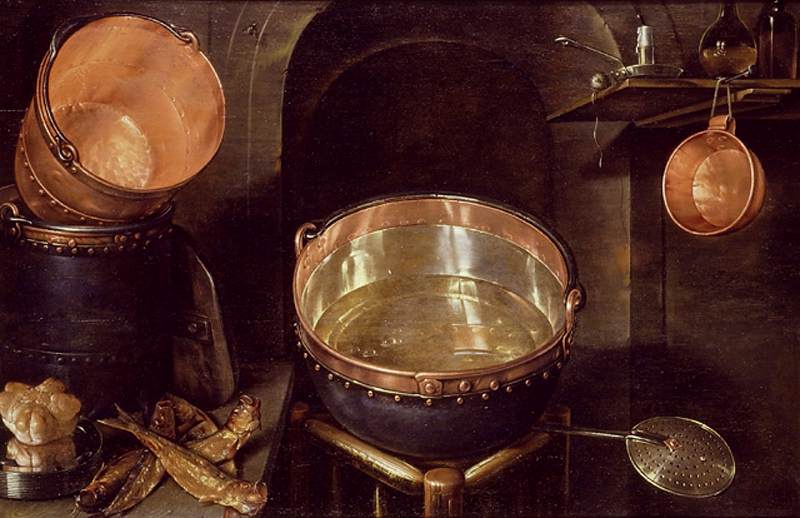
Still-Life of Kitchen Utensils

Delff was born in Gouda. According to Houbraken he was first a pupil of his father Jacob Delff, and then of Cornelis van Haarlem. He was the brother of the painter Willem Jacobsz Delff and a good painter of still lifes.

According to the RKD he became a member of the Delft Guild of St. Luke in 1613, and his kitchen still life paintings were followed by Sir Nathaniel Bacon (1585-1627), Gillis Gillisz. de Bergh, and Jan Willemsz. van der Wilde. He died in Delft.
