= Gillis Gillisz. de Bergh =

Dutch painter

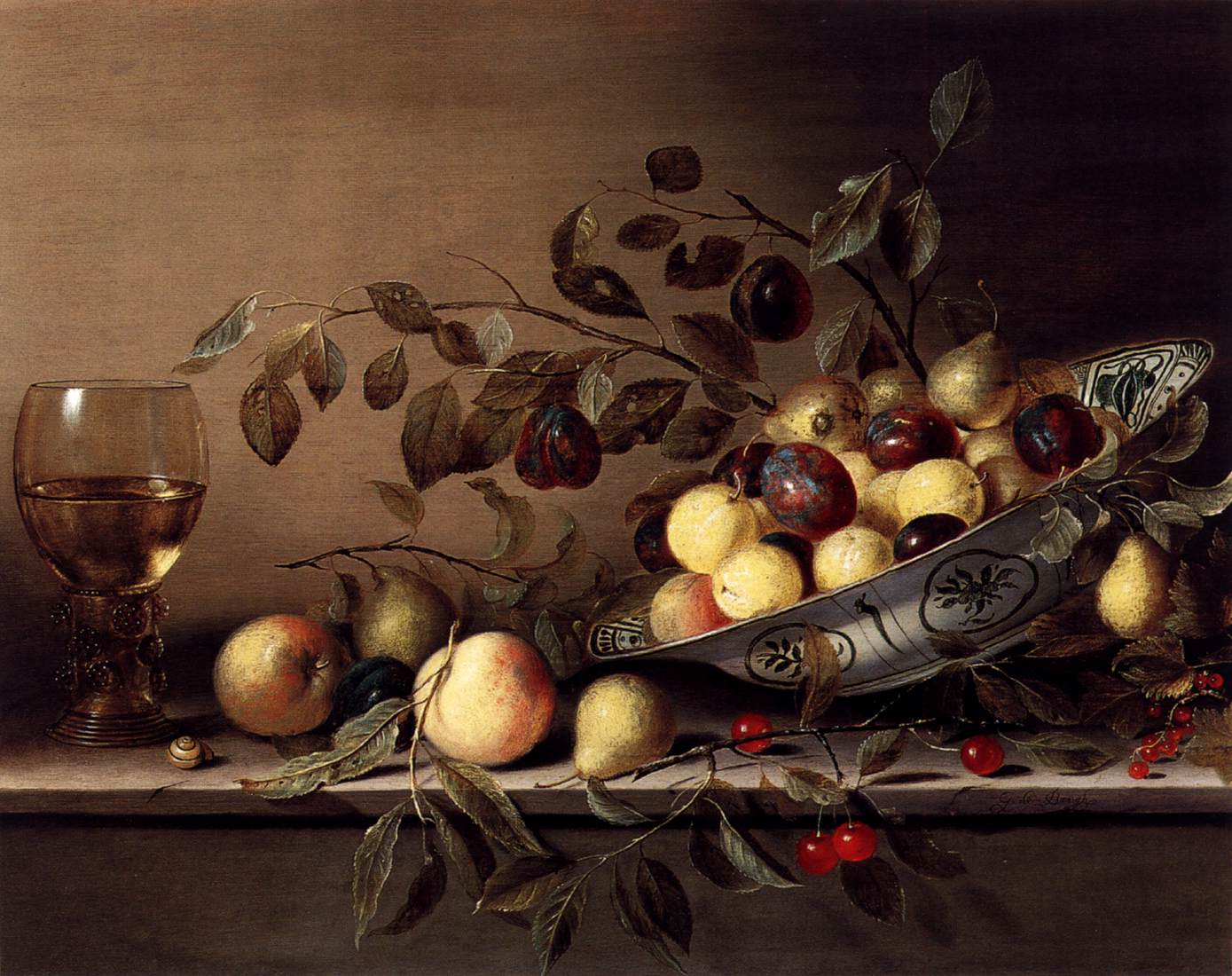
Still life, ca. 1638

Gillis Gillisz. de Bergh (1600 in Delft – 1669 in Delft), was a Dutch Golden Age painter.

According to the RKD, he was a still life painter influenced by Cornelis Jacobsz Delff, who became a member of the Delft Guild of St. Luke in 1624.
