= Willem Jacobsz Delff =

Dutch painter and engraver (1580–1638)

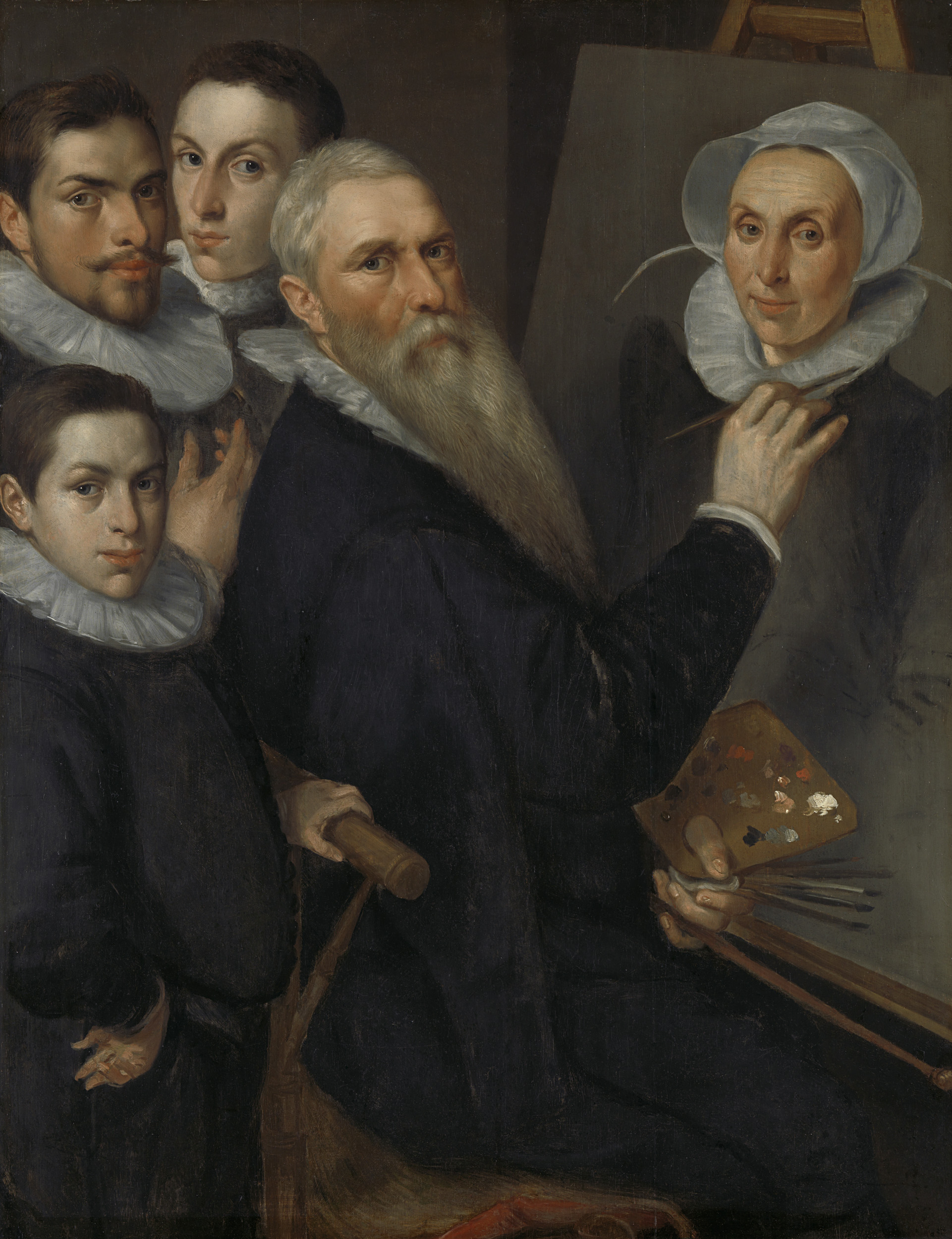
- Father's family portrait, c. 1590. Willem is the boy on the lower left.
- Born: c. October 1580; Delft, County of Holland, Habsburg Netherlands
- Died: 14 April 1638 (aged 57); Delft, Dutch Republic
- Education: Jacob Willemsz Delff the Elder
- Known for: Engraving; Painting
- Movement: Dutch Golden Age painting

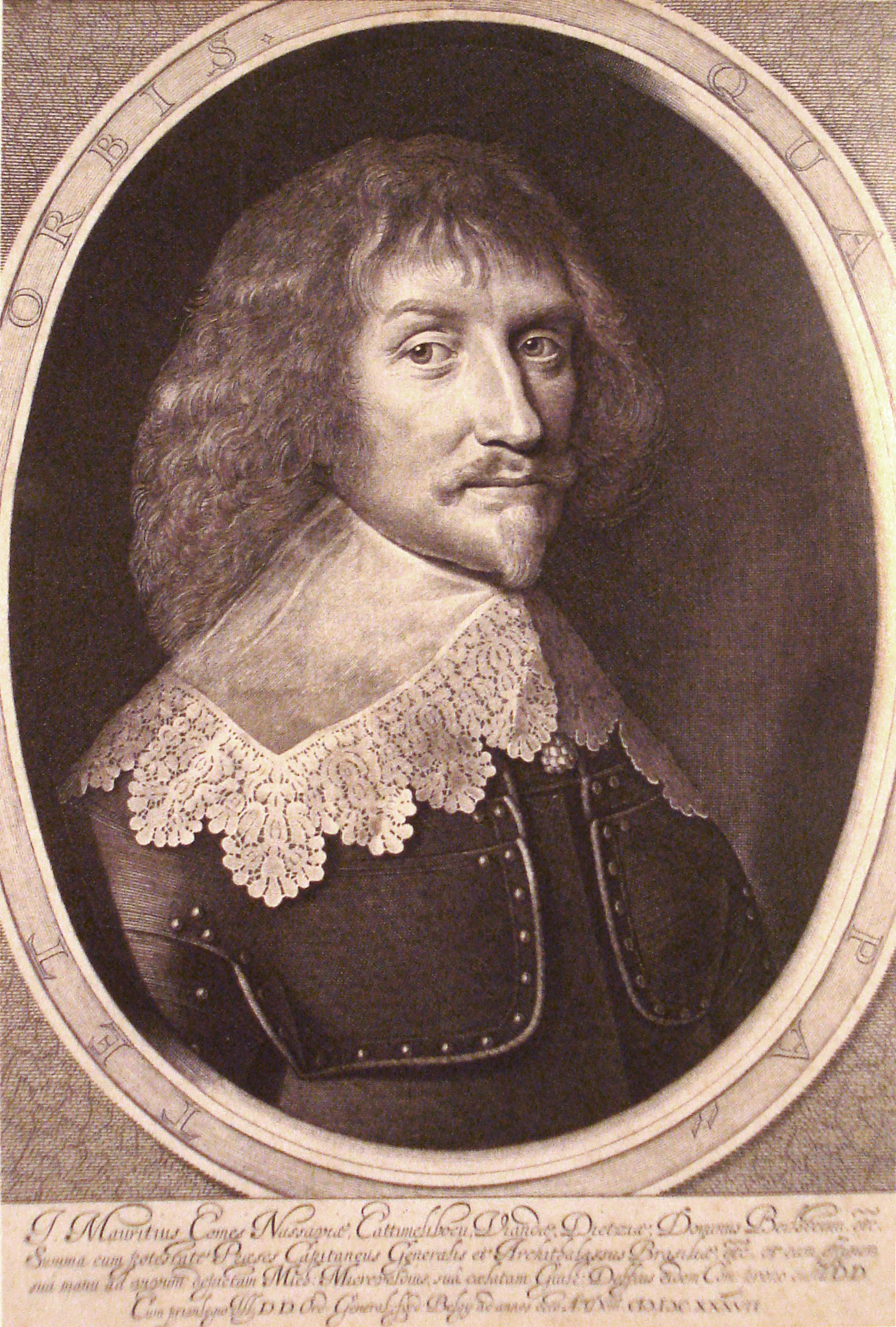
Willem Delff's engraving of Michiel van Mierevelt's painting of Maurice of Nassau

Willem Jacobsz Delff (c. October 1580 – 14 April 1638) was a Dutch Golden Age engraver and painter.

== Early life ==
Delff was born c. October 1580 in Delft. He learned painting from his father, Jacob Willemsz. Delff the Elder, who painted a family portrait with his sons and wife Maria Joachimsdr Nagel.

== Career ==
Jacob's sons were all artists in their own right; Cornelis (top left in the portrait) became a still life painter, while Rochus (between Cornelis and his father) became a portrait painter like his father.

== Personal life ==
Willem married a daughter of Michiel Jansz van Mierevelt and became a renowned engraver.

His son Jacob Willemsz Delff the Younger became a painter.

== Death ==
He died on 14 April 1638 in Delft.
