= Jacob Willemsz Delff =

Dutch painter (died 1601)

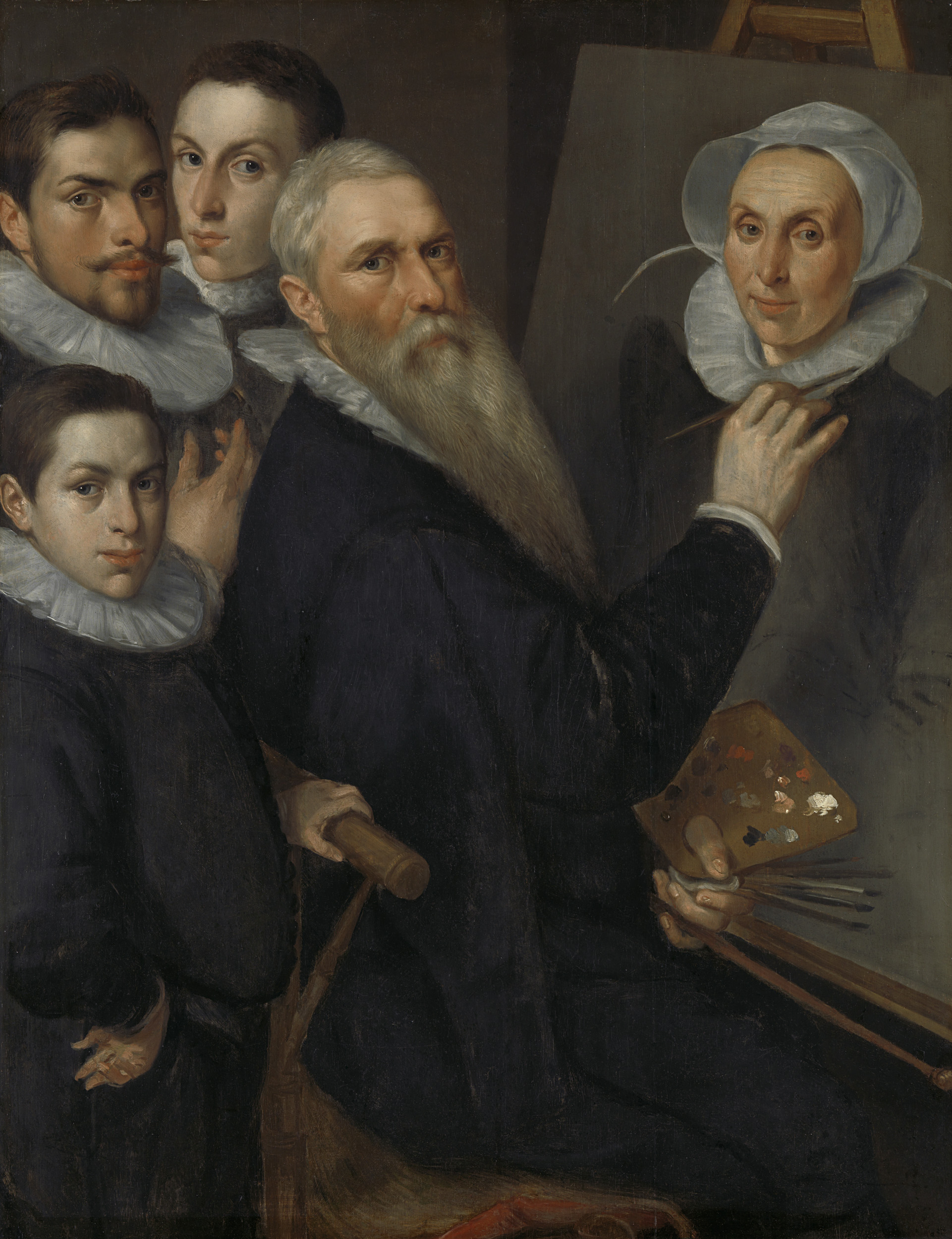
Portrait of the artist and his family, c. 1590, now at the Rijksmuseum Amsterdam

Jacob Willemszoon Delff, the Elder, (c. 1550 in Gouda – 5 May 1601 in Delft), was a portrait painter active in Delft. He is known by a picture of an 'Archery-feast' in the Hotel de Ville at Delft, dated 1592; and by a Reconciliation of Esau and Jacob, in the Belvedere at Vienna, bearing the date 1584. He also painted The Sportsman's Dinner, and a portrait group of his family. His works display good conception and execution, but are somewhat heavy in colouring.

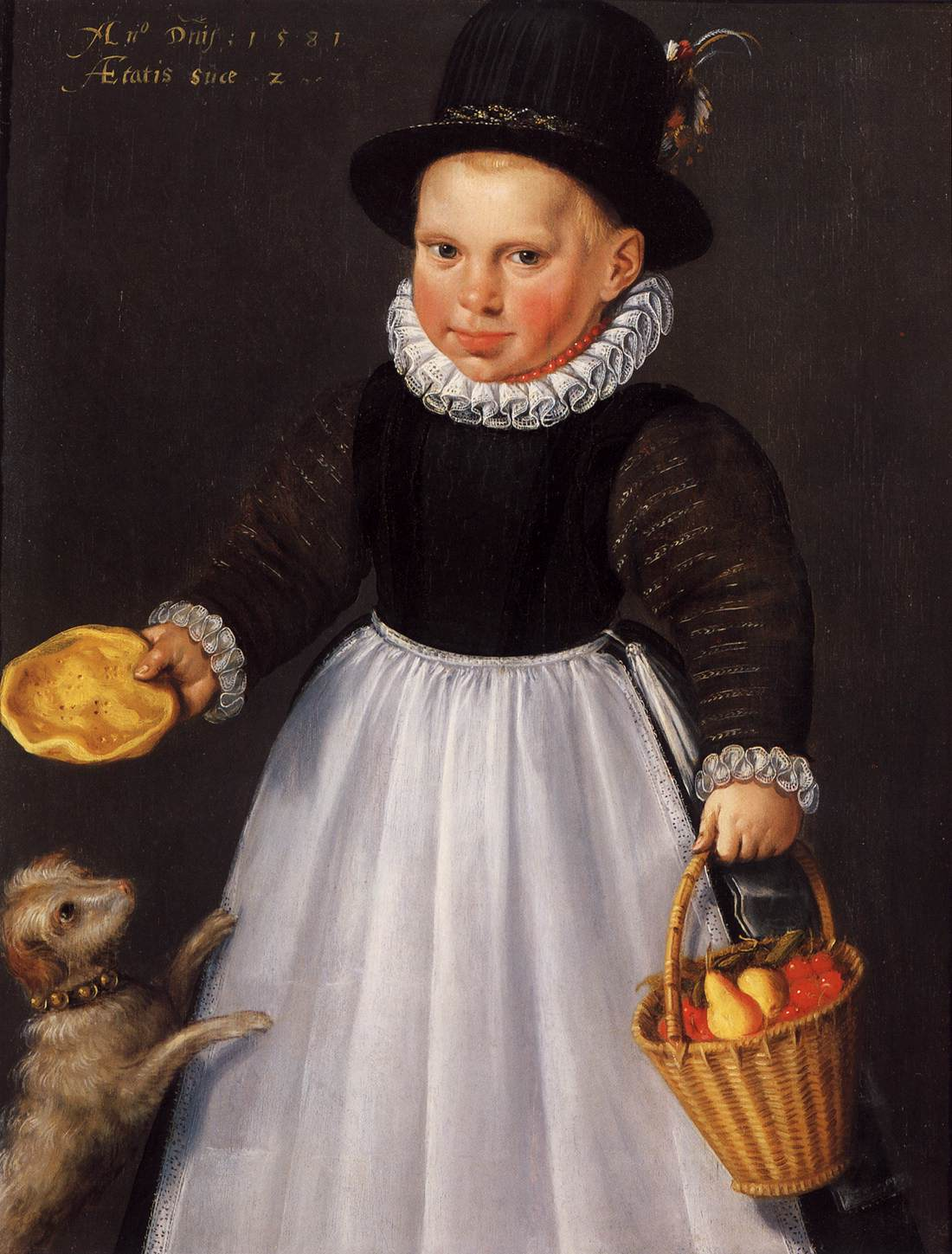
Portrait of a boy aged two, 1581, now at the Rijksmuseum

Jacob Delff had three sons, Cornelis, Rochus, and Willem. Cornelis Jacobsz Delff (Gouda c. 1571-15 August 1643, Delft), was a pupil of his father and of Cornelis van Haarlem, and distinguished himself by very fine pictures of still life. Rochus Delff was a portrait painter, and a pupil of his father.
