= Peiser =

Peiser may refer to:

== Places ==
- Pyzdry, Poland, known as Peiser (פייזר) in Yiddish

== People ==
- Benny Peiser (born 1957), Israeli anthropologist
- Felix Peiser (1862–1921), German Semiticist
- Irene Prador (née Peiser; 1911–1996), Austrian actress
- Judy Peiser (born 1945), American filmmaker
- Lilli Palmer (née Peiser; 1914–1986), German actress
- Richard B. Peiser, American academic
- Romuald Peiser (born 1979), French footballer
- Simon ben Judah Löb Peiser (born c. 1690), Polish rabbi
- Theodore Peiser (1853–1922), American photographer
