= Kampman =

Kampman is a surname. Notable people with the surname include:

- Aaron Kampman (born 1979), American football player
- A.A. Kampman (1911–1977), Dutch scholar
- Harri Kampman (born 1954), Finnish football manager
- Jessie Kampman (born 2000), French windsurfer
- Rudolph Kampman (1914–1987), Canadian ice hockey player

== See also ==
- Kampmann
