= Frank Scholten =

Dutch photographer and author

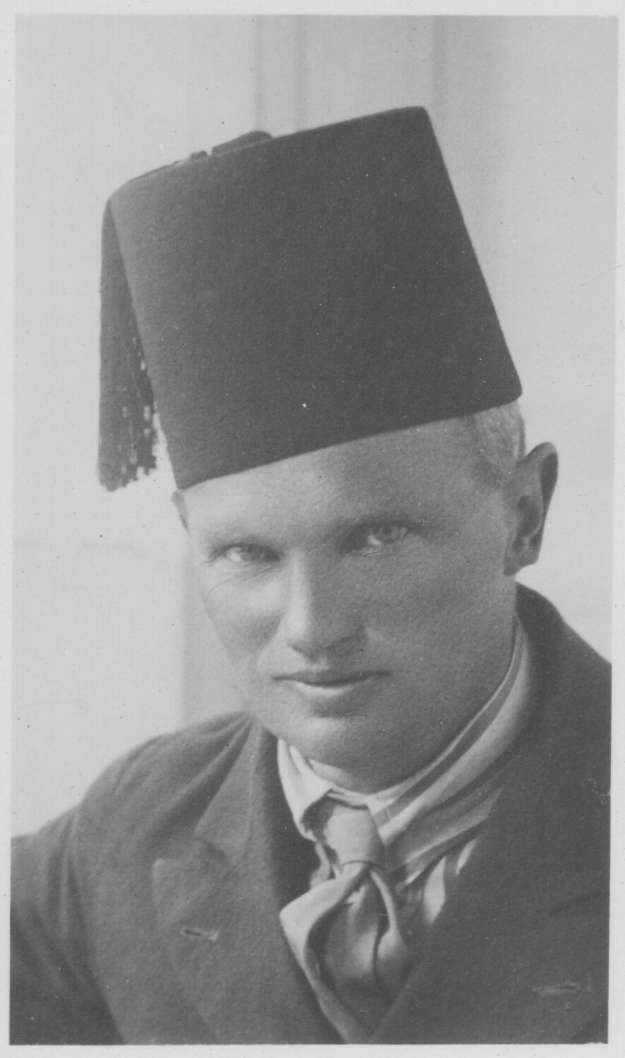
- Frank Scholten, ca. 1924
- Born: 30 August 1881; Amsterdam, the Netherlands
- Died: 29 August 1942 (aged 60); Leiden, the Netherlands
- Occupations: photographer, author
- Notable work: La Palestine illustrée, I La Porte d'entrée Jaffa, and II Jaffa la belle, Paris 1929

François "Frank" Scholten (30 August 1881 – 29 August 1942) was a Dutch photographer and author.

== Family ==
Frank Scholten was the second child of investment broker Petrus Wilhelmus Scholten (1835–1913) and jonkvrouw Elisabeth Maria Anna Henrietta van Bevervoorden tot Oldemeule (1876–1889). He spent his childhood in Amsterdam and Portsmouth. After the death of his mother, his father remarried jonkvrouw (Dutch for female squire) Maria Anna Ploos van Amstel; two further children were born from this marriage.

== Youth ==
At age sixteen Scholten moved to a boarding school for boys from well-to-do-families in Noordwijk. He studied art, music, and philosophy in Berlin from 1908 until the start of the First World War, which forced him to return to Amsterdam. He was acquainted with Jacob Israël de Haan, whom he later met again in Palestine, and he was involved in the Amsterdam gay scene. In 1920 he was sentenced to two years in prison for pederasty, but left the country.

== Photographic travels ==
Scholten made a long journey via Cologne, Rome (where he spent several months), Brindisi and Athens to Palestine. He then spent three years in Palestine, traveling the region, and photographing people and biblical places.

== Publications ==
Having returned to Europe in early 1923, he exhibited a selection of 2200 of his photos at the Brook Street Art Gallery in London. The exhibition, titled "Palestine in Transition", was favourably reviewed in many English and foreign newspapers.

He then started the publication of his photographs in a series of volumes titles Palestine Illustrated. The first two volumes appeared in a French edition in 1929 and contained photos of Jaffa, combined with verses from the Bible, the Talmud and the Quran. As a result of the Wall Street crash of 1929 Scholten lost a large sum of money, but nevertheless continued publication of his two volumes in German, English and Dutch editions. Further volumes were projected but never published.

As the Second World War made travel in Europe impossible, Scholten took up residence in Leiden. He continued working on his publications at the library of the Netherlands Institute for the Near East (Dutch language: Nederlands Instituut voor het Nabije Oosten, NINO). He had befriended Franz Böhl, one of its two directors (and Professor of Assyriology at Leiden University; previously of Hebrew at Groningen).

== Legacy ==
Scholten died in 1942. He bequeathed his photographic archive and documentation to NINO, and his capital to the city of Leiden. The municipality created the Frank Scholten Fund, which served to finance the publication of several scholarly books in a Scholten memorial series by NINO (ca. 1950–1980), and provided loans for the acquisition of the institute's housing.

In the early 2000s Scholten's photo archive was rediscovered at NINO. In 2019–2020 a project was initiated at Leiden University for the complete digitization and cataloguing of the collection.

== Some photographs by Scholten ==
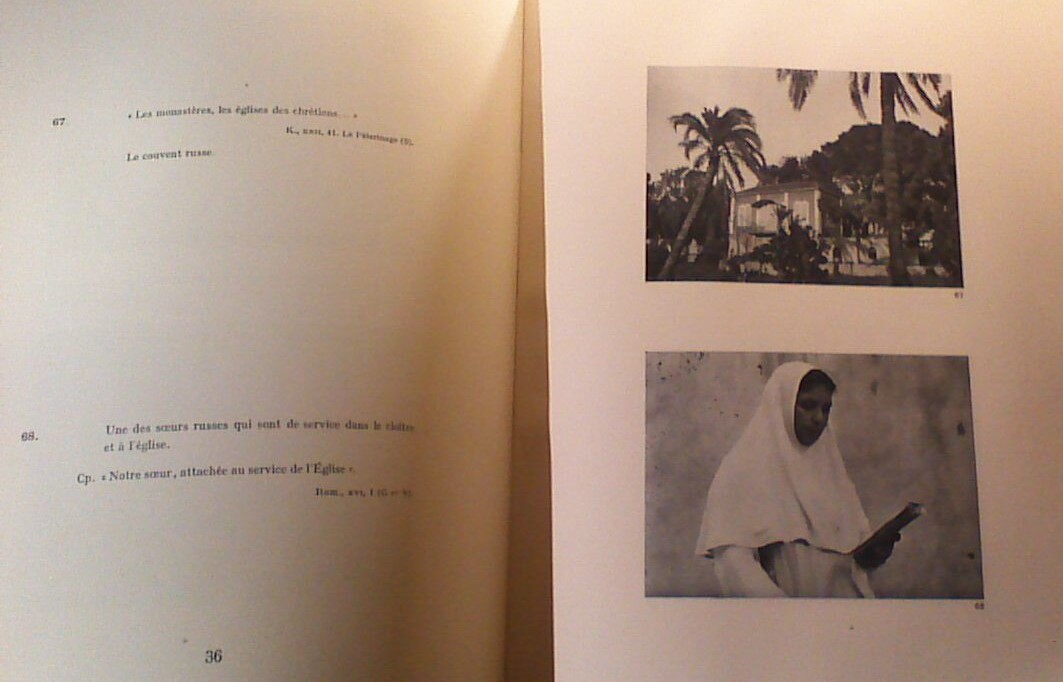
La Palestine illustrée (1929). Photo 67.

Al-Amari Zidani mosque, Tiberias.

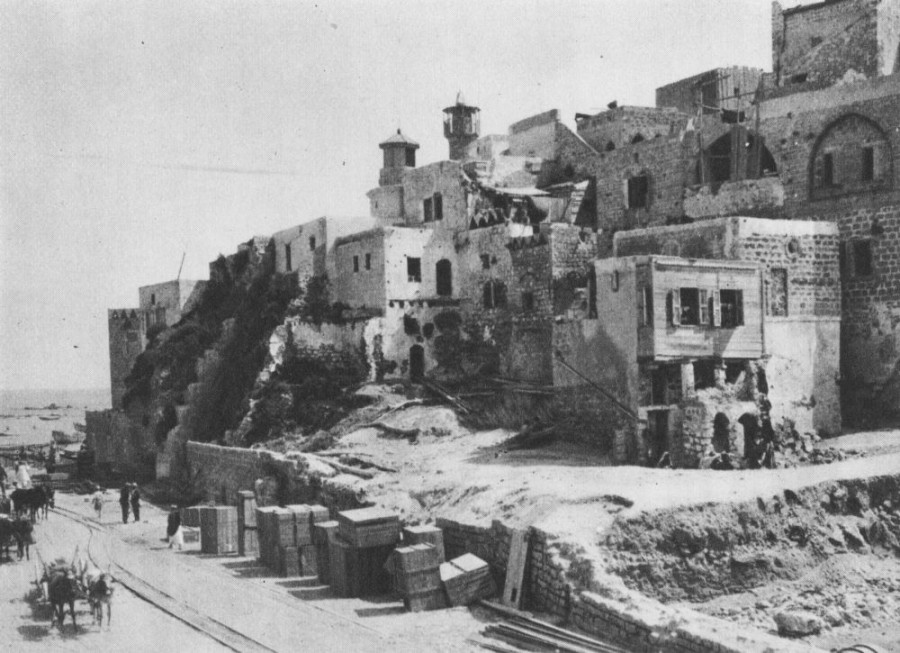
Palestine (1920s).

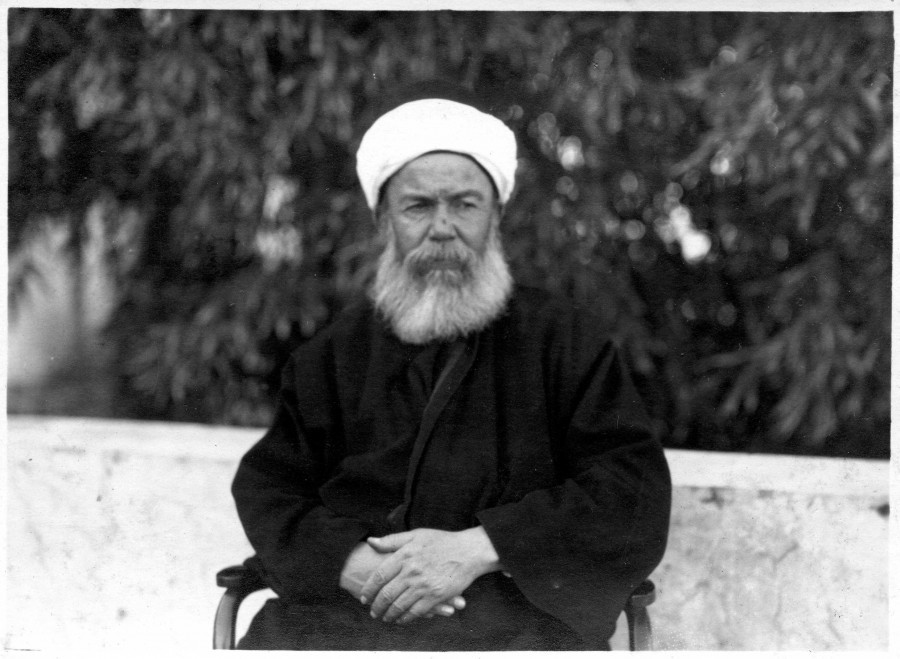
Judge in Jaffa (1920s).

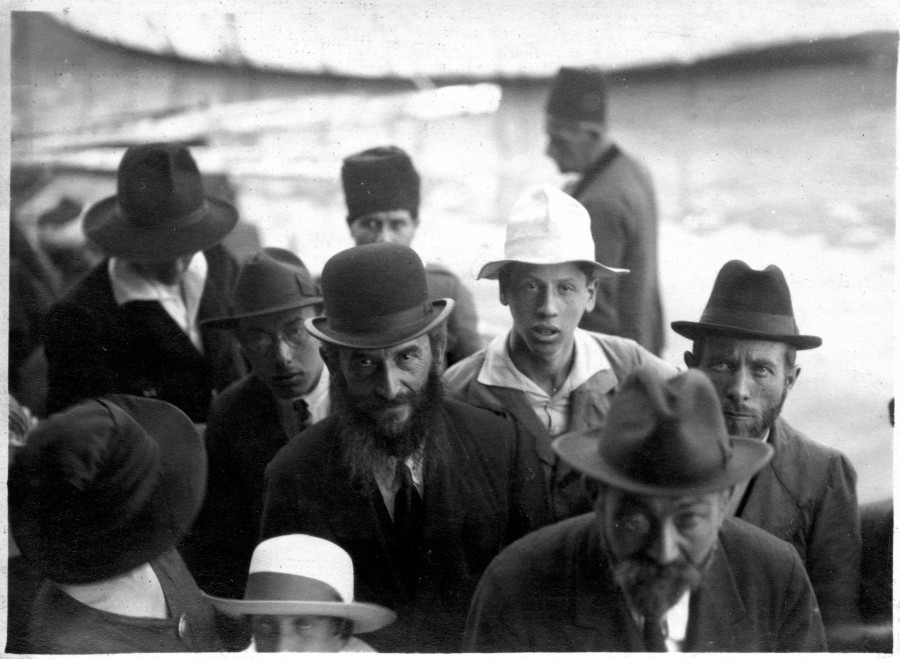
Immigrants in Jaffa.
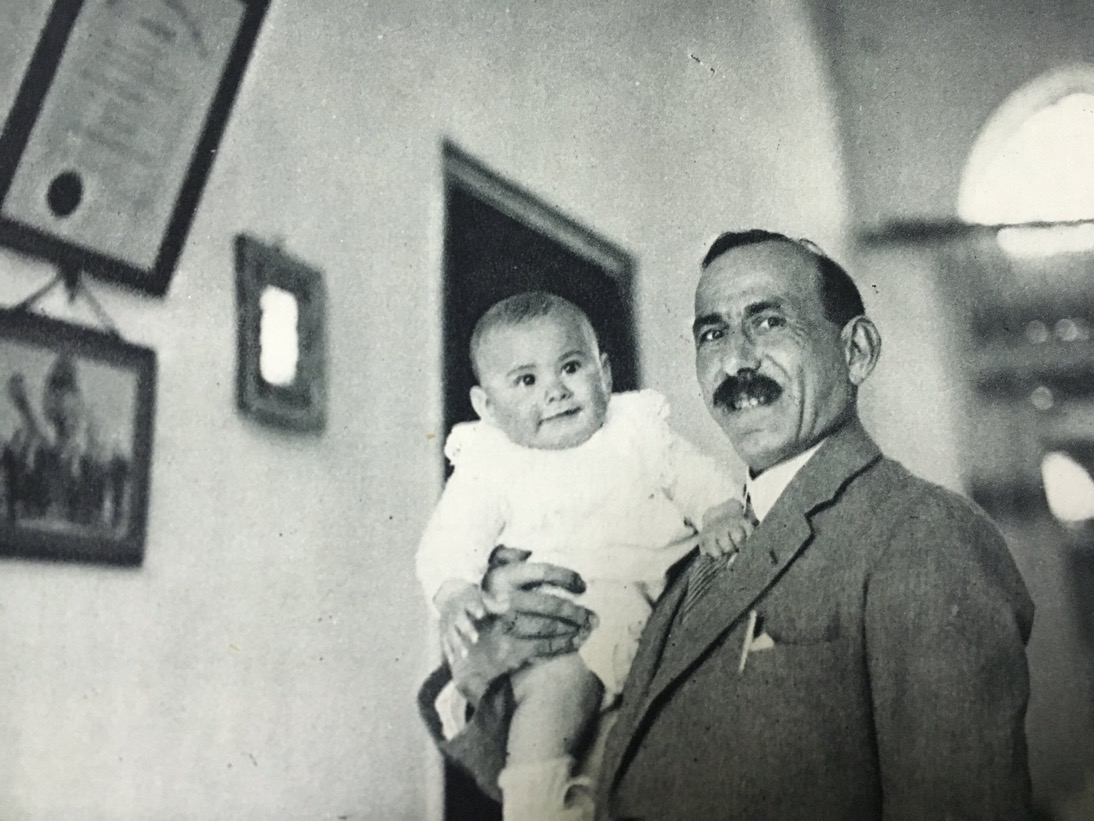
Palestinian journalist Issa El-Issa holding his daughter Raja in Jaffa.

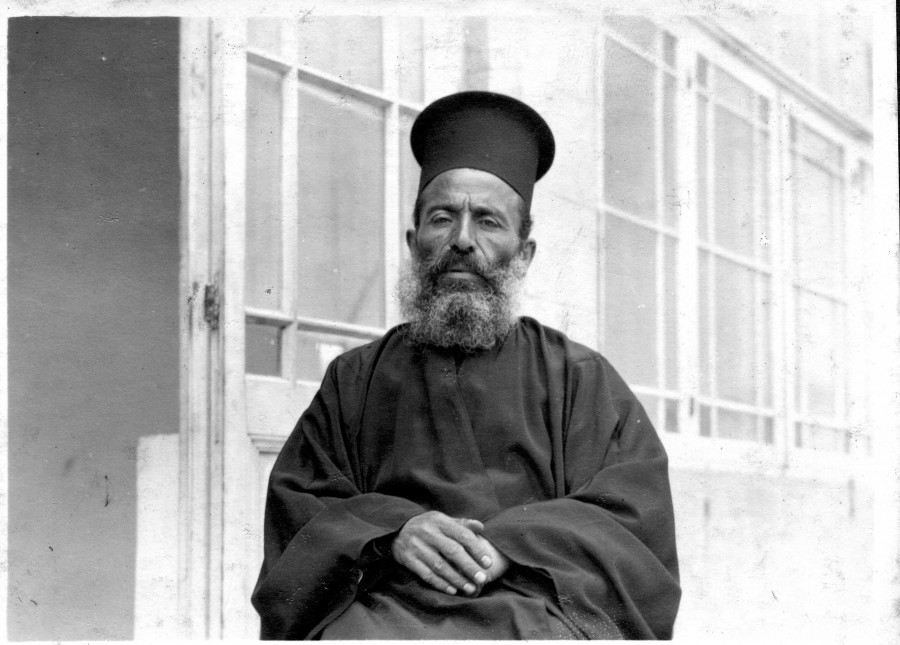
Melkite priest in Jaffa.

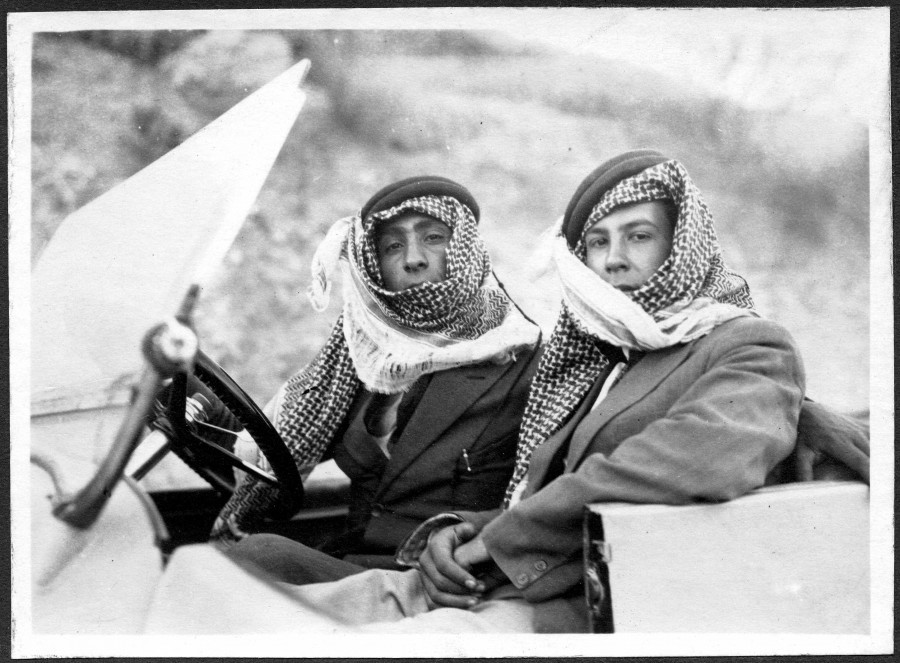
Boys in Palestina.

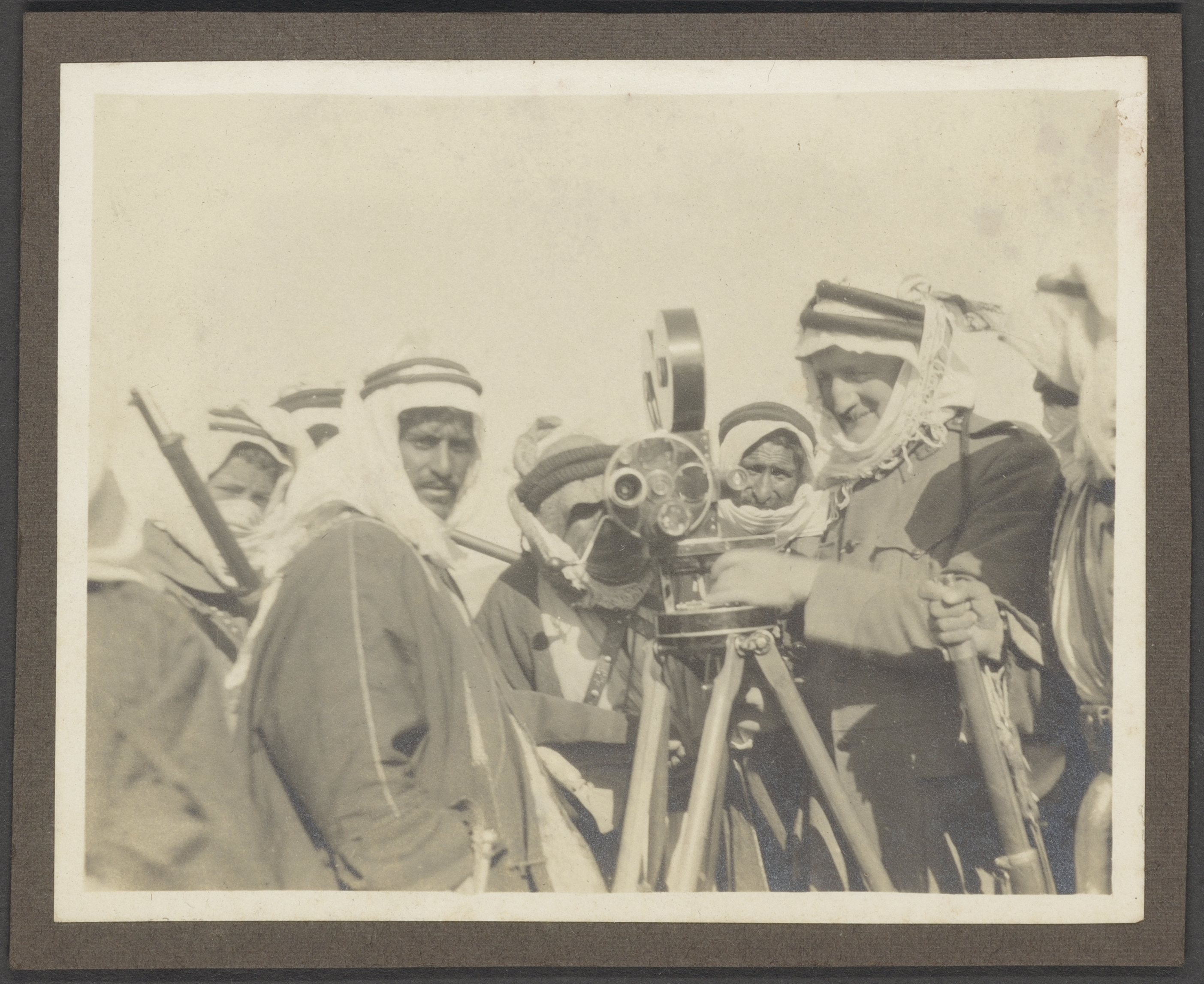
Armed men around a film camera

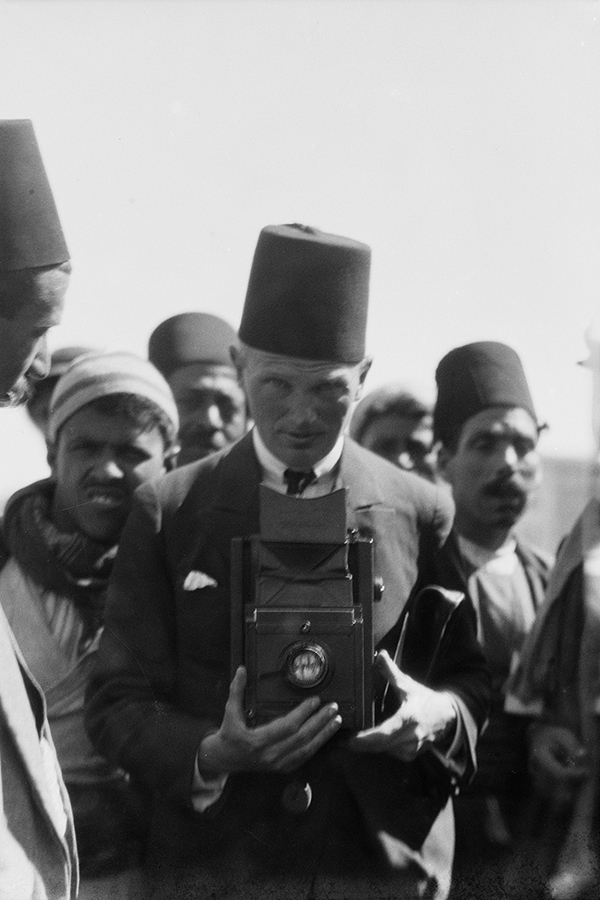
Self portrait in a mirror.

== Published works ==
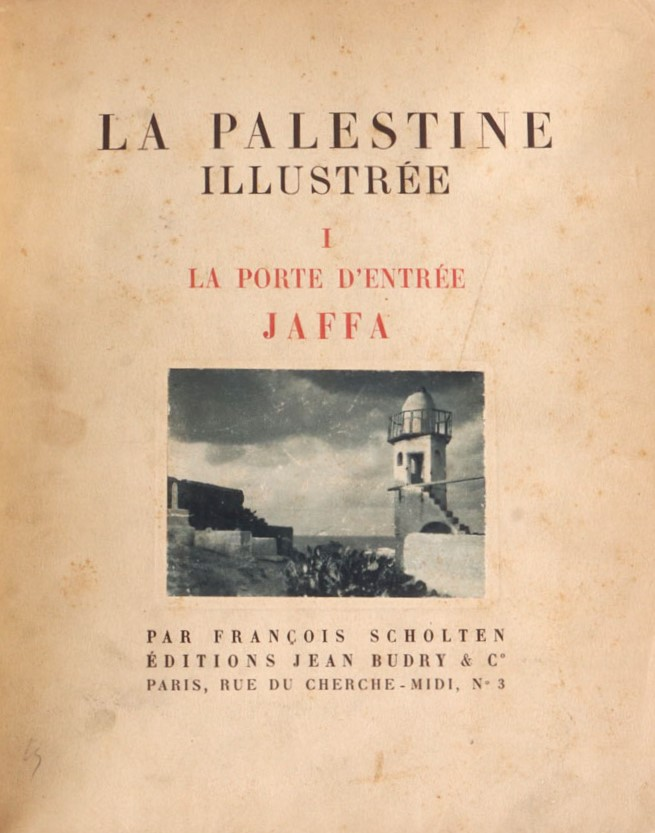
La Palestine Illustrée. I. La Porte d'entrée Jaffa, Paris - Jean Budry & Cie, 1929.

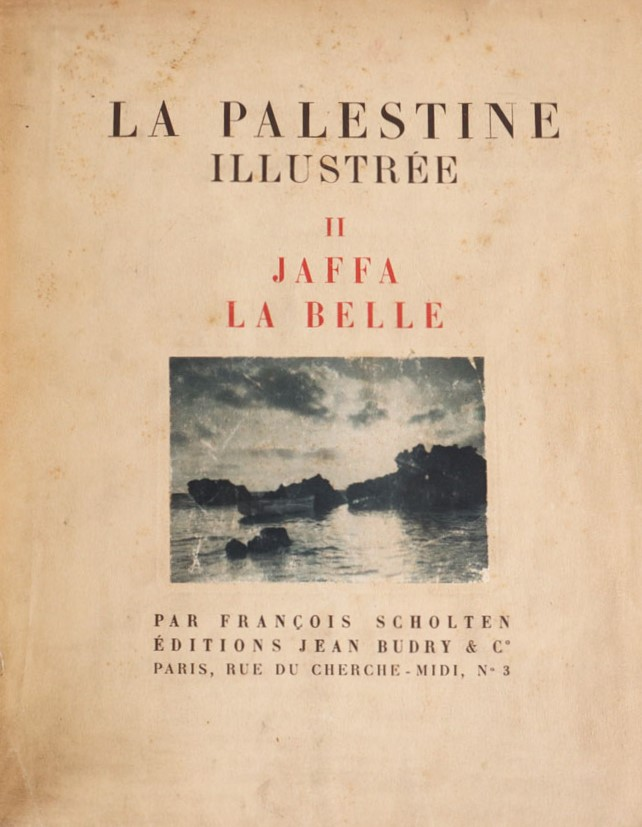
La Palestine Illustrée. II. Jaffa la belle, Paris Jean Budry & Cie, 1929.

- La Palestine Illustrée. Tableau complet de la terre Sainte par la photographie, Évoquant les souvenirs de la bible, du talmud et du coran, et se rapportant au passé comme au présent. Vol. I: La Porte d’entrée Jaffa; Vol. II: Jaffa la Belle. Parijs: Budry, 1929.
- Palästina. Bibel, Talmud, Koran. Eine vollständige Darstellung aller Textstellen in eigenen künstlerischen Aufnahmen aus der Gegenwart und Vergangenheit des Heiligen Landes. Vol. I: Die Eingangspforte Jaffa; Vol. II: Jaffa, die Schöne. Stuttgart: Julius Hoffmann, 1930.
- Palestine Illustrated. Including references to passages illustrated in the Bible, the Talmud and the Koran. Vol. I: The Gate of Entrance; Vol. II: Jaffa the Beautiful. Londen: Longmans, 1931.
- Palestina. Bijbel, Talmud, Koran. Een volledige illustratie van alle teksten door middel van eigen artistieke foto’s uit het heden en verleden van het Heilig Land. Vol. I: Jaffa de toegangspoort. Leiden: Sijthoff, 1935.
