= Kampmann =

Kampmann is a surname. Notable people with the surname include:

- Anja Kampmann (born 1983), German poet and novelist
- Beate Kampmann, German physician
- Christian Kampmann (1939–1988), Danish author and journalist
- Christina Kampmann (born 1980), German politician
- Hack Kampmann (1856–1920), Danish architect
- Hack Kampmann (1913–2005), Danish-Swedish architect
- Martin Kampmann (born 1982), Danish mixed martial artist
- Mel Kampmann, American journalist and news director
- Steven Kampmann (born 1947), American actor, writer, and director
- Viggo Kampmann (1910–1976), leader of the Danish Social Democrats and Prime Minister of Denmark (1960–1962)

== See also ==
- Kampman
