= Emeri van Donzel =

Dutch historian (1925–2017)

Emericus Joannes van Donzel (5 July 1925 in Nieuwstadt − 29 October 2017 in Wassenaar) was a Dutch historian of the Middle East, with particular interests in Ethiopia and the interaction between the Islamic world and Christianity.

He served as director of the Netherlands Institute for the Near East and editor-in-chief of the Encyclopaedia of Islam. He received the Akademiepenning of the Royal Netherlands Academy of Arts and Sciences, an honorary doctorate from the University of Hamburg and the medal of an Officer in the Order of Oranje-Nassau.

The Netherlands Institute for the Near East (Dutch: Nederlands Instituut voor het Nabije Oosten) remembers him as one of the managers that has driven NINO through one of the most crucial phases of its existence. He was sent abroad, to Addis Abeba, the capital of Ethiopia due to his knowledge of Semitics and Sanscrit languages, as well as the Indonesian culture. One of his other approaches was related to the interaction between Christianity and Islam, for which he studied the life and writings of Sayyida Salme and the culture of Arabic people in Africa and Central Asia.
