= Klever Reichswald =

Forest in North Rhine-Westphalia, Germany

Coordinates: 51°44′35″N 6°02′35″E

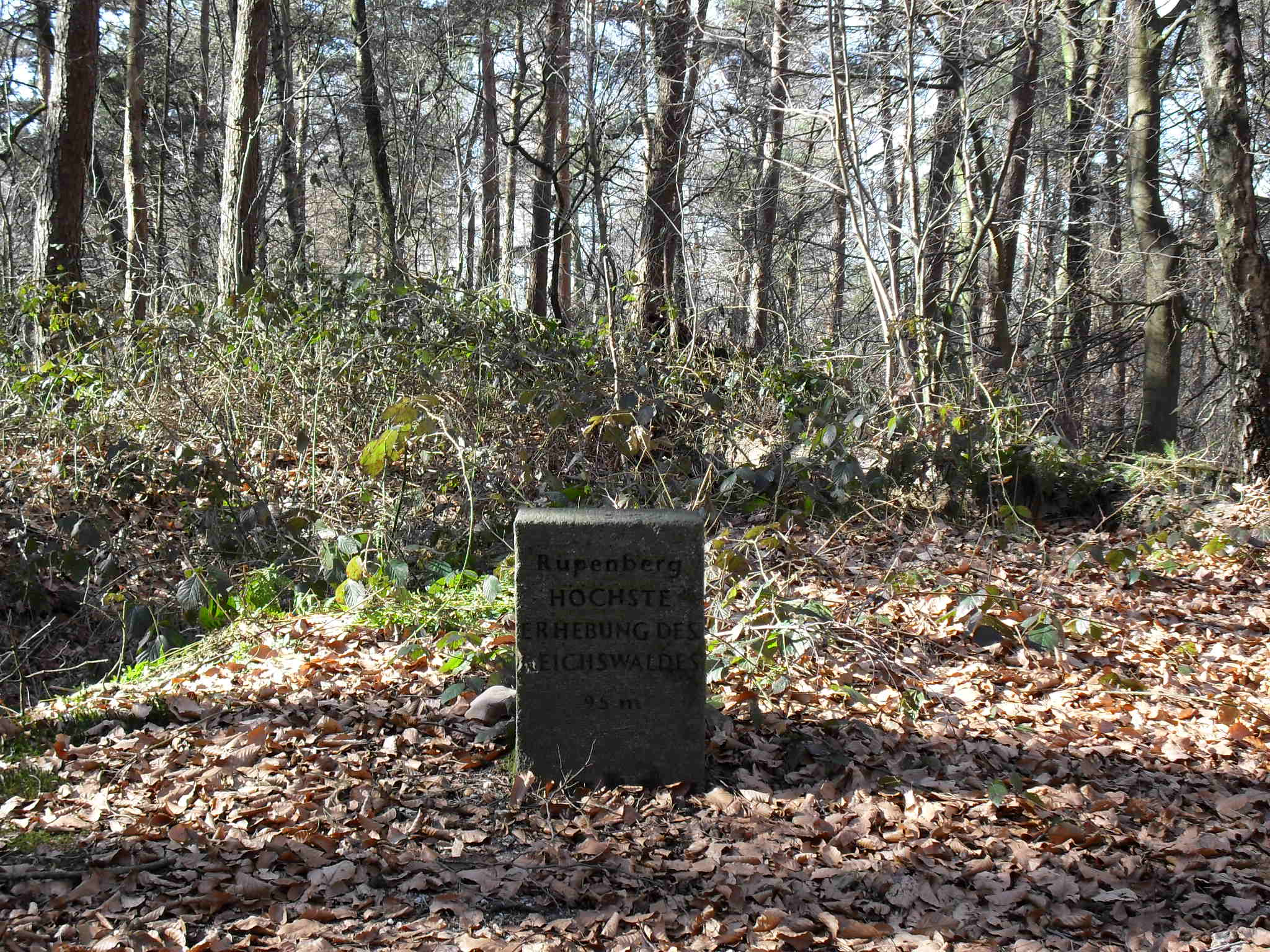
Picture of the Rupenberg (taken in August 2017)

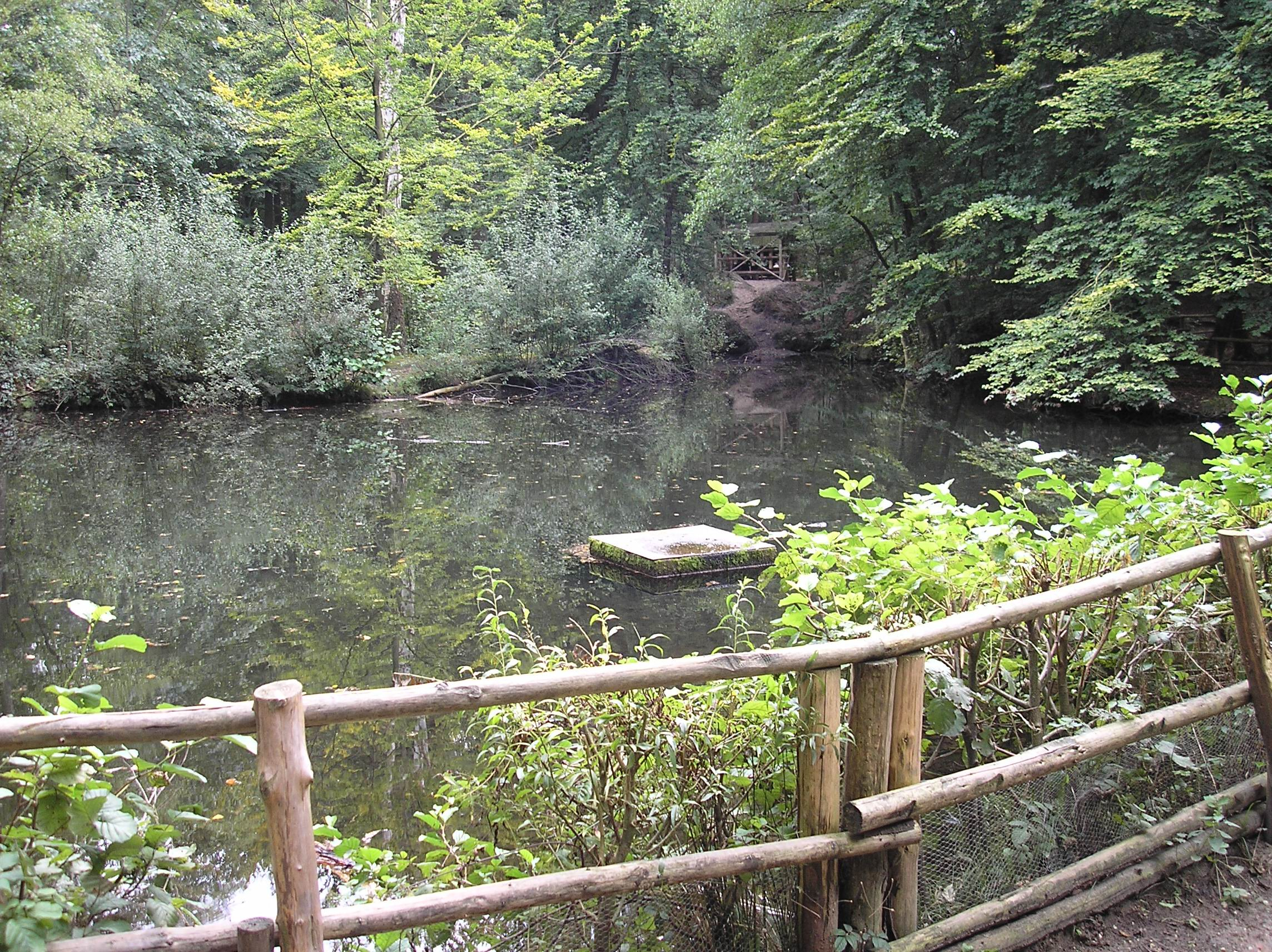
The Reichswald near Kranenburg

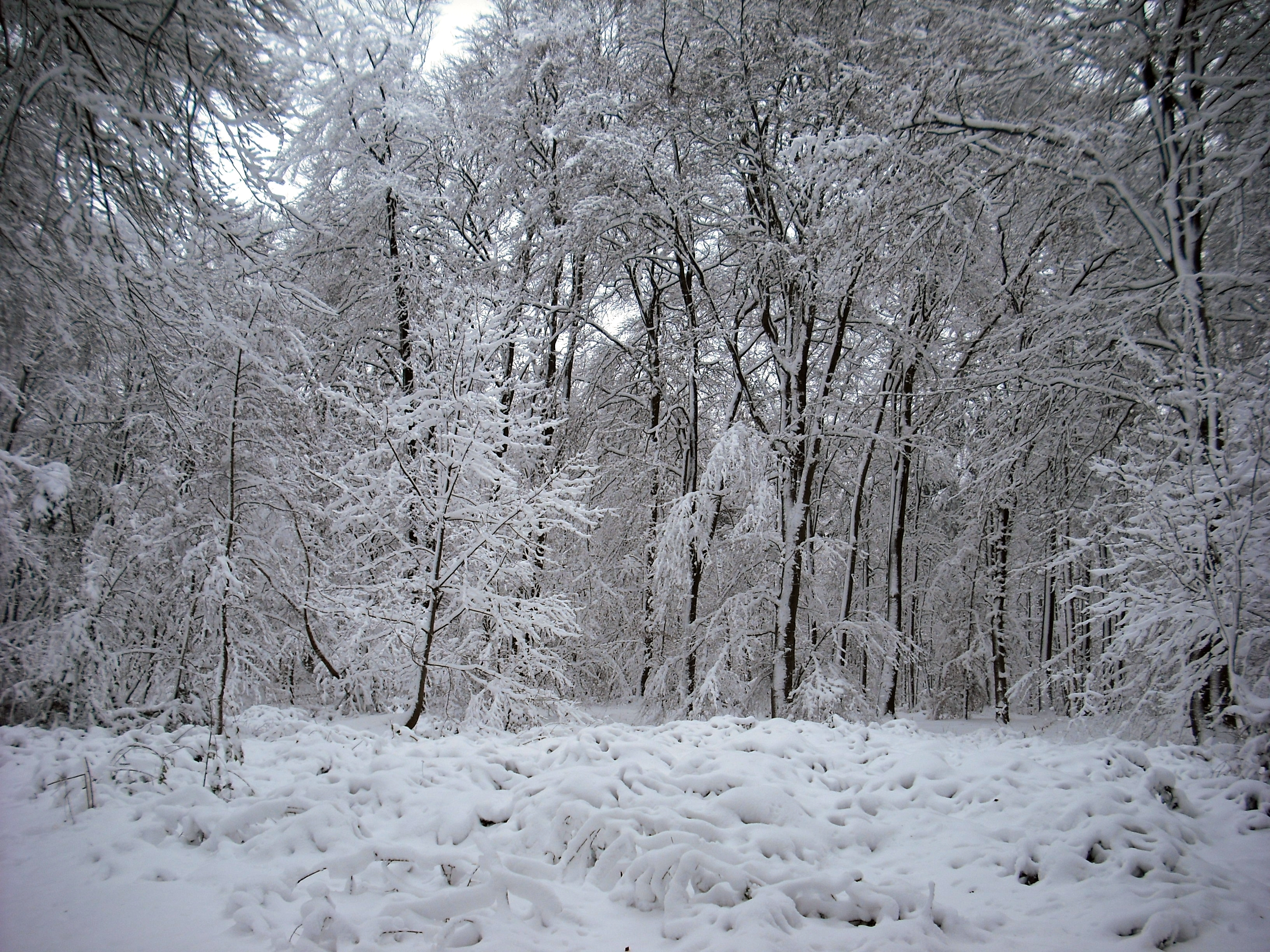
The Reichswald in the winter near Kleve

The Klever Reichswald is a state forest in North Rhine-Westphalia, Germany, between the rivers Rhine and Meuse at the German–Dutch border. The forest is located in the municipal territories of Kleve, Goch, Kranenburg and Bedburg-Hau. It is the largest coherent wooded area of the lower Rhine and the largest coherent public state forest of North Rhine-Westphalia with an area of 51 km^{2} (20 sq mi).

== Landscape and forest ==
The Reichswald is on the ridge of the lower Rhine, which was created by glaciers. In the Ice Age a range of hills were created, which contrasts the flat Rhine plain. 31 of the hills reach heights above 50 meters. One of the highest hills is the Rupenberg with 95 meters, located at the eastern end of the Reichswald.

The forest is a closed mixed deciduous forest dominated by copper beech. For some areas the oak is predominant; for some other parts conifer forest is dominant.

In the west the Reichswald merges into woodland of the province Gelderland in the Netherlands. These are almost closed over the municipalities of Milsbeek, Mook en Middelaar, Berg en Dal and Heumen to Nijmegen.

== Protected area ==
Except small subareas the complete Reichswald is under landscape and nature protection. The majority is in Area of Outstanding Natural Beauty: at AONB Waldgebiet Reichswald (c. 3875 ha, in Kleve, Kranenburg and Goch), at AONB Reichswald (c. 166 ha, in Bedburg-Hau) and at AONB Pfalzdorfer Höhenrand and Nierstal (only subareas at Reichswald, in Goch). The northern forest areas near the core of Kleve could be counted to the Reichswald as well. They are at AONB Standortübungsplatz einschließlich der Umgebung westlich Kleve (c. 126 ha) and at AONB Waldgebiet des Tiergartenwaldes (c. 295 ha).

In the northwest area of the Reichswald the protected areas Quellen am Stoppelberg is (c. 2,9 ha, in Kleve) and in the middle of the forest the protected area Geldernberg (c. 580 ha, in Kleve, Kranenburg and Goch). Geldernberg is known as the core area of the Reichswald and is stated as the FFH-Area DE-4202-302 Reichswald, which puts it in the European network of protected areas Natura 2000. The AONB Geldenberg is of particular importance because it is the largest, largely closed, predominant hardwood old-growth forest in the Reichswald and is home to endangered species like the golden oriole, black woodpecker, honey buzzard and stag beetle.

== History ==
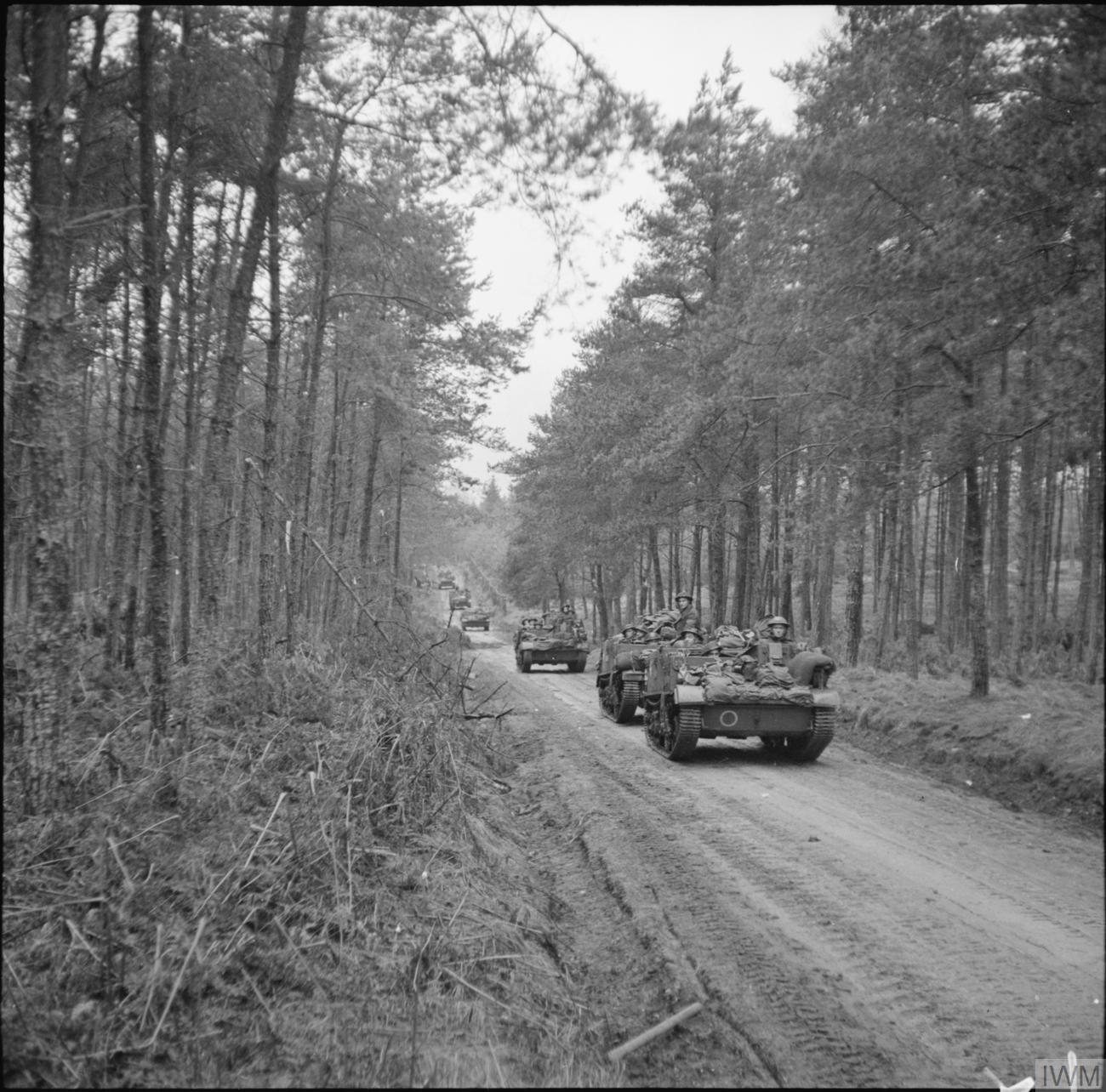
Universal carriers of the 2nd Seaforth Highlanders in the Reichswald, 10 February 1945

In the Second World War, Klever Reichswald was the location of the Battle of the Reichswald, also known as Operation Veritable, in February and March 1945. In this protracted battle against British and Canadian troops on Germany's Western Front, German lines under General Alfred Schlemm (of the Luftwaffe) had been reequipped. The Siegfried Line was the most fortified in this area, and the troops were re-enforced by elite and experienced soldiers well prepared for protracted fighting. The terrain largely nullified the Anglo-Canadians' advantages in equipment, armament and munitions, and manpower. On the German side, over 90,000 men fought in this battle, and 52,000 were taken prisoner. On the Anglo-Canadian side, nearly 200,000 men were engaged in the fighting, with 23,000 casualties. The Reichswald Forest War Cemetery is situated here. It is the largest Commonwealth cemetery in Germany.

== Geology ==
As the Reichswald is on a glacial ridge, it is not subjected to flooding. The glacial gravel contains much loam from the northern German plain and this makes the surface extremely muddy when using the unmetalled roads during a rainy period.

== See also ==
Media related to Klever Reichswald at Wikimedia Commons
