= Böhl Collection =

The De Liagre Böhl Collection of Cuneiform Inscriptions or Böhl Collection is a collection of clay tablets and other objects inscribed with cuneiform texts in Leiden, the Netherlands.

== Description ==
The collection is named after its collector, Frans de Liagre Böhl. It comprises the largest collection of cuneiform tablets in the Netherlands. In addition to 3355 cuneiform objects (including seals), the collection incorporates a small number of objects from the ancient Near East and Egypt. The owner of the collection is The Netherlands Institute for the Near East in Leiden; the cuneiform tablets are available for consultation in the Special Collections Reading Room of Leiden University Libraries. A few objects from the Böhl Collection are on display in the permanent gallery "The Ancient Middle East" of the National Museum of Antiquities, Leiden.

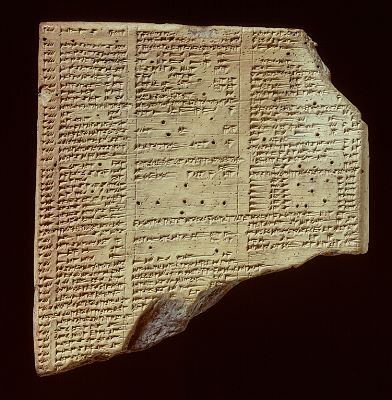
Clay tablet from the library of Ashurbanipal (De Liagre Böhl Collection)
