= Frans de Liagre Böhl =

Professor of Assyriology and Hebrew (1882–1976)

Franz "Frans" de Liagre Böhl
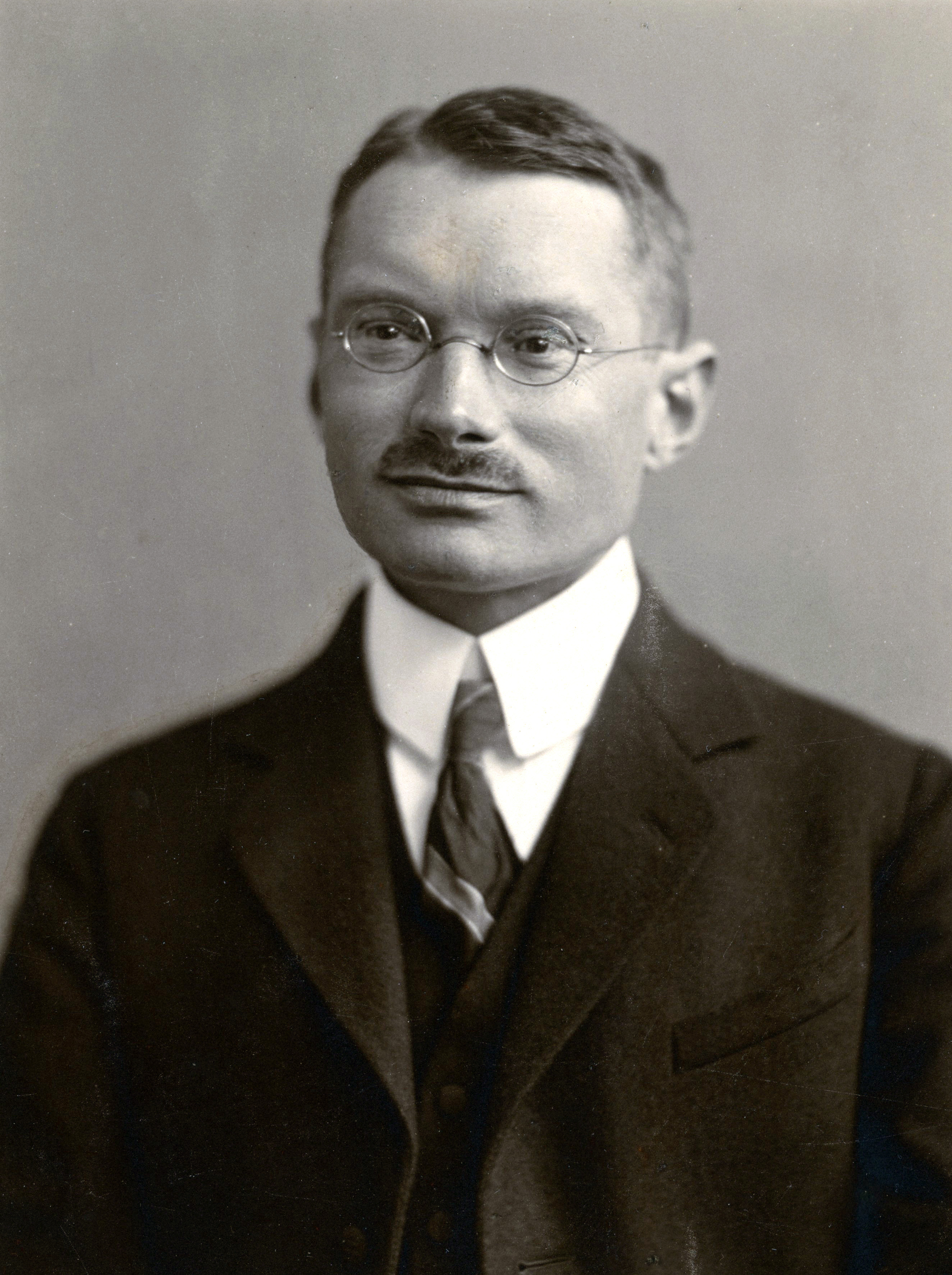
- Frans de Liagre Böhl in 1925
- Born: Franz Marius Theodor de Liagre Böhl; August 16, 1882; Vienna
- Died: November 16, 1976 (aged 94); Milsbeek, The Netherlands
- Spouse: Maria Anna Dorothea Strasburger
- Children: four, including the historian and biographer Herman de Liagre Böhl (1943)

Academic background
- Education: University of Leipzig, University of Berlin

Academic work
- Discipline: Assyriology, Hebrew, Old Testament studies
- Institutions: University of Berlin, University of Groningen, University of Utrecht, The Netherlands Institute for the Near East
- Notable students: Arie Abraham Kampman (1911-1977)

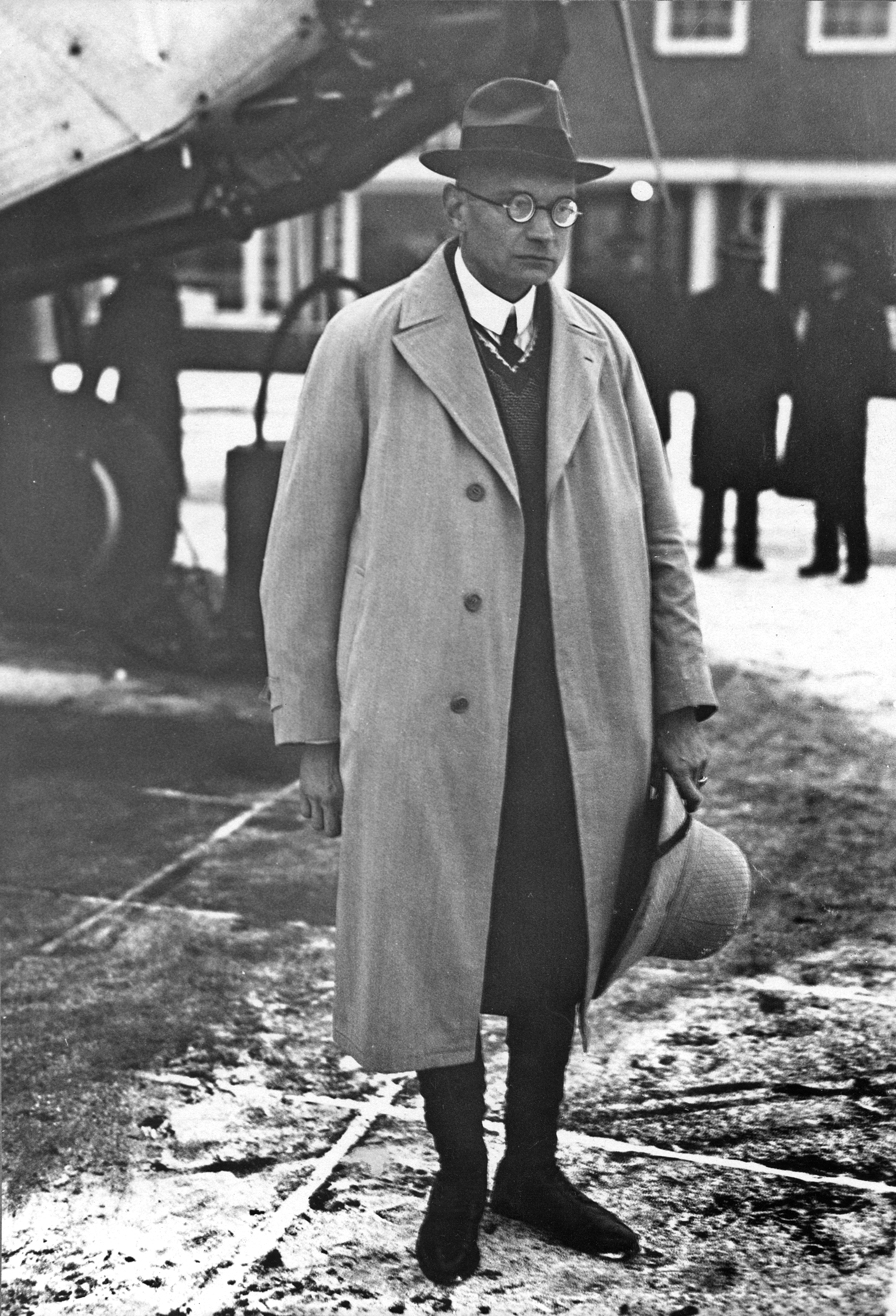
De Liagre Böhl at Amsterdam airport Schiphol, 1932.

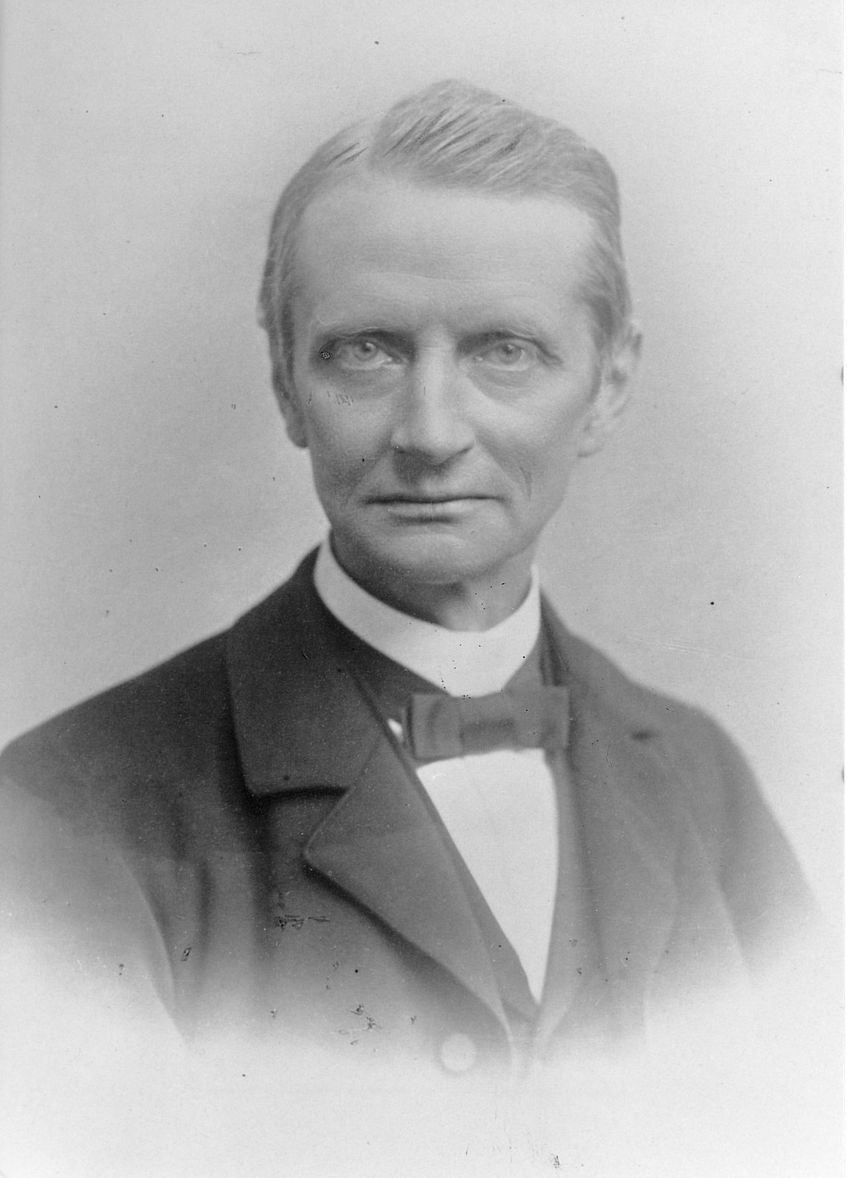
Eduard Böhl (1836–1903), Frans de Liagre Böhl's father and a Reformed theologian.

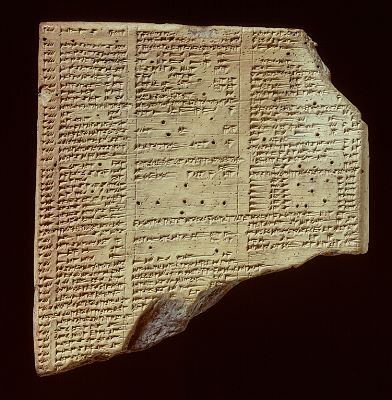
Clay cuneiform tablet listing astrological Moon omens, as a part of the Sîn ina tāmartīšu commentary. A fragment from the library of king Assurbanipal (reigning from 669 BCE to 631) at Nineveh. Collection De Liagre Böhl, Leiden, 669-627 BC.

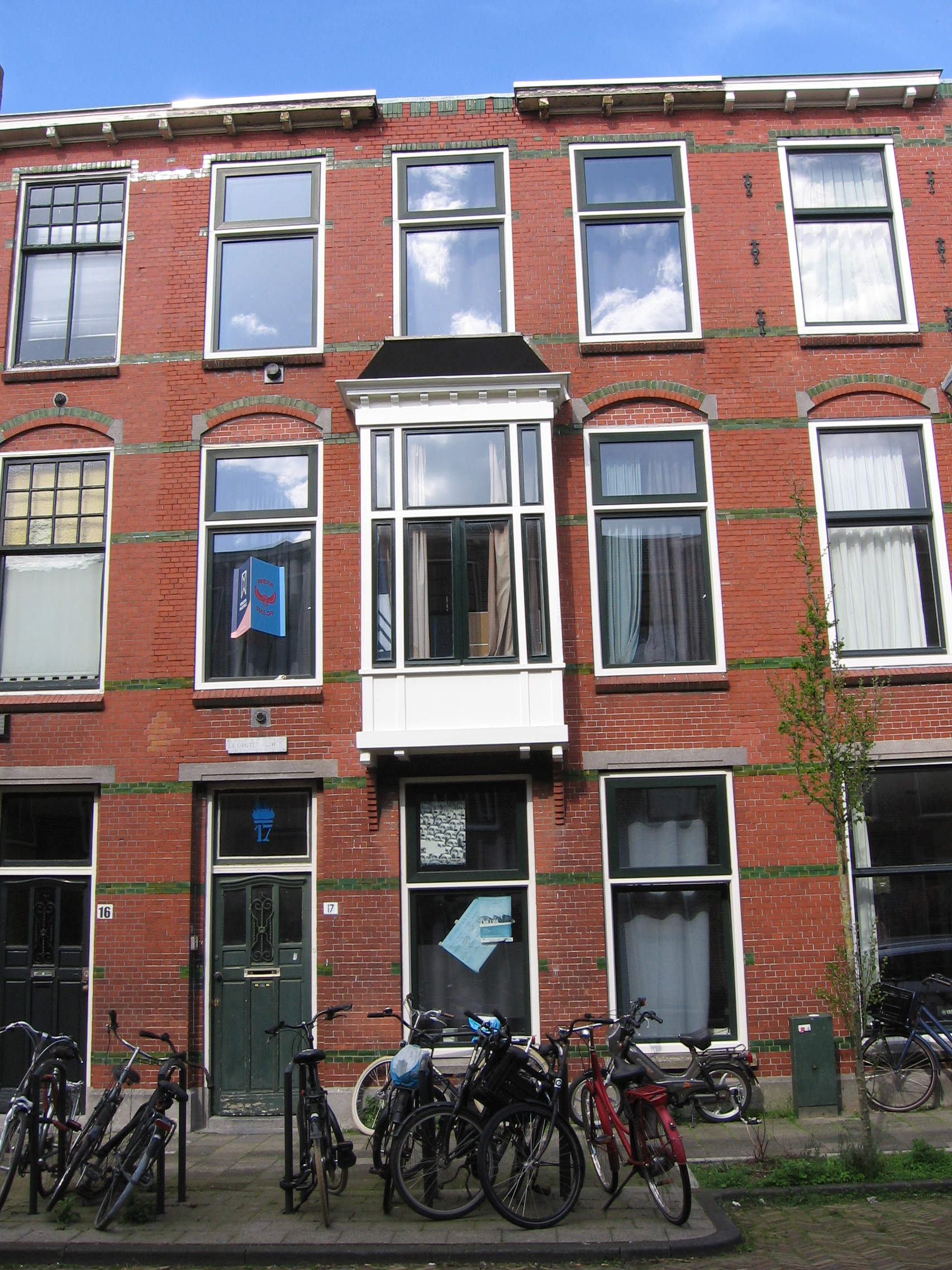
Former residence of De Liagre Böhl at Groenhovenstraat 17 in Leiden, 2023.

Franz "Frans" Marius Theodor de Liagre Böhl (Vienna, Austria, 16 August 1882 – Milsbeek or Nijmegen, the Netherlands, 16 November 1976) was a Dutch professor of Assyriology and Hebrew.

His father was Eduard Böhl (1836–1903), a well-known Protestant clergyman and later a professor of Old Testament studies at the University of Vienna, who had married the daughter Anna of the influential Dutch Protestant theologian Hermann Friedrich Kohlbrugge (1803–1875). His second marriage was with Baroness Jacoba Frederica "Jacqueline" van Verschuer (1846–1921), who became Franz's mother.

In 1949 Franz Böhl added de Liagre to his surname Böhl, to prevent his grandmother's birth name from becoming extinct. He married Elisabeth Henriëtte Fabius (1886–1921) in 1914 and Marie Anna Dorothea Strasburger (1905–1996) in 1933. Franz de Liagre Böhl was the father of Herman de Liagre Böhl (1943), a Dutch historian and biographer of the Dutch poet Herman Gorter (1864–1927) and of his own father.

== Education ==
De Liagre Böhl studied Assyriology and theology at the University of Leipzig and the Friedrich Wilhelm University in Berlin and wrote two dissertations in German: Die Sprache der Amarnabriefe, mit besonderer Berücksichtigung der Kanaanismen (a 1909 linguistic study, with translated title: The language of the Amarna letters, with special reference to (linguistic) Canaanisms), and Kanaanäer und Hebräer, Untersuchungen zur Vorgeschichte des Volkstums und der Religion Israels auf dem Boden Kanaans (a 1911 Licentiate thesis, with translated title: Canaanites and Hebrews, investigations into the prehistory of the people and religion of Israel on Canaan soil).

== Career ==
After holding a teaching position as a Privatdozent in Berlin, De Liagre Böhl was appointed professor of Old Testament studies in Groningen, the Netherlands, in 1913, as a successor to professor F.C. van den Ham, where he continued up to 1927. His field was Hebrew and Hebrew antiquity (Dutch: Hebreeuws en Hebreeuwse oudheden). In 1925 he was rector of the University of Groningen. De Liagre Böhl bought Felix Peiser's collection of cuneiform tablets, the start of his own collection, which he put on display in his Semitische Werkkamer (Semitic Workshop), with antiquities from the Levant and Mesopotamia.

In 1927 he was appointed professor of Assyriology (Dutch: Talen en de geschiedenis van Babylonië en Assyrië, Languages and history of Babylonia and Assyria) at Leiden University. In Leiden, Liagre Böhl lived at 17-18 Groenhovenstraat, where he also moved his Werkkamer.

In the years 1926-1928 he worked as an epigrapher in the archeological campaign of his father's Berlin colleague professor Ernst Sellin at Tell-el-Balâta (Tell Balata), the site of the biblical town of Sichem (Shechem) near Nablus in Palestine.

== The Netherlands Institute for the Near East (NINO) ==
De Liagre Böhl was closely involved in the establishment of The Netherlands Institute for the Near East (Dutch: Nederlands Instituut voor het Nabije Oosten, NINO) by his student Arie Kampman. From 1939 to 1955 De Liagre Böhl was a director of the Institute in tandem with the Egyptologist professor Adriaan de Buck (1892–1959). After De Liagre Böhl's retirement in 1953, he remained closely involved with the institute. He had sold his collection of more than 2000 objects, including cuneiform inscriptions of the Werkkamer to NINO in 1951. This Collection De Liagre Böhl comprises the largest collection of clay tablets in the Netherlands; some masterpieces are exhibited in the Rijksmuseum van Oudheden in Leiden.

== Honours ==
In 1924 he became a member of the Royal Netherlands Academy of Arts and Sciences. He received several international university honorary appointments:

- University of Bonn, honorary Doctor of Theology, 1915
- University of Rostock, honorary staff member, 1919
- University of Debrecen, honorary staff member, 1939
- Old University of Leuven, honorary Doctor of Oriental languages, 1947
- Brussels, Royal Flemish Academy of Belgium for Science and the Arts, member, 1946.

== Bibliography ==
=== Works by Frans de Liagre Böhl ===
De Liagre Böhl published many scholarly works, including:

- Die Sprache der Amarnabriefe : mit besonderer Berücksichtigung der Kanaanismen, Leipzig : Hinrichs, 1909. In German.
- Kanaanäer und Hebräer : Untersuchungen zur Vorgeschichte des Volkstums und der Religion Israels auf dem Boden Kanaans, Leipzig : Hinrichs, 1911. In German.
- Die Juden im Urteil der griechischen und römischen Schriftsteller, Theologisch Tijdschrift. Bd. XLVIII(1914), 371–389, 473–484. In German.
- Ausgewählte Keilschrifttexte aus Boghaz-Köi, Leiden : S.C. van Doesburgh, 1916. In German.
- Het Oude Testament. Bijbelsch-kerkelijk woordenboek, Groningen [etc.] : Wolters, 1919. In Dutch.
- De opgraving van Sichem : bericht over de voorjaarscampagne en de zomercampagne in 1926, Zeist : Ruys, 1927. In Dutch.
- Nieuwjaarsfeest en Koningsdag in Babylon en Israël, inaugural lecture Leiden University, 1927. In Dutch.
- Das Zeitalter Abrahams, Leipzig : Hinrichs, 1930. In German.
- Palestina in het licht der jongste opgravingen en onderzoekingen, H.J. Paris, Amsterdam, 1931. In Dutch.
- Die fünfzig Namen des Marduk, 1936, Archiv für Orientforschung, 11, 1936, 191. JSTOR ISSN 41634940. Also published as a book: Berlin: Weidner, 1936. In German.
- Der babylonische Fürstenspiegel, Leipzig : Harrassowitz; 1937. In German.
- Het Gilgamesj epos : nationaal heldendicht van Babylonië / vertaald [uit het Akkadisch] en toegelicht door F.M.Th. De Liagre Böhl, 1941. In Dutch.
- Babylonische-Assyrische letterkunde, Utrecht : W. de Haan [1943]. In Dutch.
- De zonnegod als beschermer der nooddruftigen, Leiden, Jaarbericht van het Vooraziatisch-Egyptisch Genootschap Ex Oriente Lux (JEOL), Nr. 8, 1942. In Dutch.
- Het tijdvak der Sargonieden volgens brieven uit het koninklijk archief te Ninevé, Amsterdam : Noord-Hollandsche Uitgevers Maatschappij, Mededelingen der Koninklijke Nederlandsche Akademie van Wetenschappen, Afd. Letterkunde, ISSN 0168-6968; n.r., dl. 12, no. 8 (1949) 443–493. In Dutch.
- King Ḫammurabi of Babylon in the setting of his time (about 1700 b.C.), Amsterdam : Noord-Hollandsche Uitgevers Maatschappij, Reeks: Mededeelingen der Koninklijke Nederlandsche Akademie van Wetenschappen, Afd. Letterkunde, ISSN 0168-6968; n.r., dl. 9, no. 10 (1946), P. 341–370. In English.
- with Madelon L. Verstijnen, Akkadian chrestomathy. Vol. 1: Selected cuneiform texts, Leyden : Nederlandsch Archaeologisch-Philologisch Instituut voor het Nabije Oosten, 1947.
- with Berend Gemser, De Psalmen I: [Psalm 1-41] / door F.M.Th. Böhl. - 1946. II: [Psalm 42-89] / door F.M.Th. Böhl. - 1947. III: [Psalm 90-150] / door B. Gemser. - 1949, 1946–1949, Groningen [etc.] : Wolters, 3 vols. Reeks: Tekst en uitleg : praktische bijbelverklaring. I: Het Oude Testament. Psalm translations in Dutch. (Abbreviation: "T. en U.", for the series Tekst en uitleg.)
- Missions- und Erwählungsgedanke in Alt-Israel, Tübingen, 1950. In German.
- Babel und Bibel, Jaarbericht van het Vooraziatisch-Egyptisch Genootschap Ex Oriente Lux, no. 16 (1959–1962), Leiden, 1964. In German.
- De psalmen : tekst en uitleg, Nijkerk: Callenbach, 1968. In Dutch.
- Genesis. Tekst en uitleg : praktische bijbelverklaring. I: Het Oude Testament. In Dutch.
- with Hospers, J.H., Gilgamesj : de elfde zang : de zondvloed en het levenskruid, Utrecht: De Roos, 1985. In Dutch.
- with Kampman, Arie A. and Beek, M.A., Symbolae biblicae et Mesopotamicae : Francisco Mario Theodoro de Liagre Böhl dedicatae, Brill, 1973. In Dutch. Festschrift with a bibliography listing 321 publications by De Liagre Böhl.

=== Works by others ===
- Liagre Böhl, Herman de, Bijbel en Babel : Frans de Liagre Böhl, 1882-1976, Amsterdam: Prometheus, 2021. Biography by his son. ISBN 9789044643534. In Dutch.
