= Adriaan de Buck =

Dutch Egyptologist

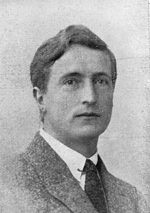
- Adriaan de Buck, ca. 1930
- Born: 22 September 1892; Oostkapelle, the Netherlands
- Died: 28 October 1959 (aged 67); Leiden, the Netherlands
- Occupation: Egyptologist
- Years active: 1922–1959
- Spouse: Anna Elisabeth Nordenberg
- Children: Ann-Kjersti, Ingrid and Pieter de Buck
- Awards: KNAW member

Academic background
- Education: Leiden University
- Thesis: De Egyptische voorstellingen betreffende den oerheuvel (1922)
- Doctoral advisor: William Brede Kristensen

Academic work
- Discipline: Egyptology
- Sub-discipline: Middle Egyptian (language)
- Institutions: Leiden University
- Notable works: The Egyptian Coffin Texts (1935-1961)

Adriaan de Buck (Oostkapelle, 22 September 1892 – Leiden, 28 October 1959) was an eminent Dutch Egyptologist. From 1939 he was Professor of Egyptology at Leiden University.

== Life and work ==
De Buck read theology in Leiden (1911–1916) with Pierre Daniel Chantepie de la Saussaye and William Brede Kristensen. He studied several Semitic languages (among them Arabic), and specialized in ancient Egyptian which he first read with Pieter Boeser. He then continued his studies in Egyptology in Göttingen and Berlin (1917–1921) with Adolf Erman and Kurt Sethe.

De Buck was ordained minister in the Dutch Reformed Church and served in the small town of Ursem (1921–1925).

On 6 July 1922 he received his doctorate in theology from Leiden University on a thesis titled De Egyptische voorstellingen betreffende den oerheuvel (“The Egyptian depictions concerning the primeval hill”), supervised by W.B. Kristensen. In 1924 he was approached by the Chicago University Oriental Institute concerning an international project for the publication of a complete text edition of the Egyptian Coffin Texts. He stepped down from his ministry in Ursem to work on the project, although he continued to occasionally preach in Leiden and its surroundings. De Buck worked on the text edition (together with Alan Gardiner) until his death, producing seven volumes. The first volume appeared in 1935, the last volume posthumously in 1961. This indispensable reference work is De Buck's greatest contribution to Egyptology. It consists of over 3,000 pages of handwritten hieroglyphic text. In 2005 the series was supplemented with a further volume composed by J.P. Allen.

De Buck was appointed lector at Leiden University in 1928, then professor extraordinarius in 1939 and full professor in 1949. From 1939 to 1955 De Buck and Assyriologist Franz Böhl were co-directors of the Netherlands Institute for the Near East in Leiden. In 1947 the International Association of Egyptologists was founded, aiming at publication of the Annual Egyptological Bibliography; De Buck was appointed chairman.

De Buck often gave lectures for the public society Ex Oriente Lux; he was a member of its advisory board and an editor of its annual Jaarbericht (JEOL). He participated in the “Serabit Expedition” (epigraphic expedition of Harvard University and Catholic University in the Sinai) in 1930. He was a member of the Royal Netherlands Academy of Arts and Sciences (1941) and Teylers Eerste Genootschap (1951–1959).

De Buck married Anna Elisabeth Nordenberg (1894–1986; a Swedish national) on 30 June 1924. The couple had two daughters and a son.

== Select bibliography ==
- Egyptisch leesboek, Deel I: Teksten, Deel II: Teeken- en woordenlijst. Leiden, 1941. Translated into English as Egyptian readingbook (1948).
- New Reading Book of Middle Egyptian Texts. Selected and Edited by Adriaan de Buck. With a New Introduction and Additional Texts Collected by Olaf E. Kaper. Egyptologische Uitgaven. Vol. 33. Leiden: The Netherlands Institute for the Near East. 2022. OCLC 1376248215.
- Egyptische grammatica. Leiden, 1944. Translated into French as Grammaire élémentaire du moyen Égyptien (1952).
- The Egyptian Coffin Texts. Chicago, 1935–1961. 7 vols.
  - de Buck, Adriaan (1935). The Egyptian coffin texts I texts of spells 1-75. The University of Chicago Oriental Institute Publications. Chicago: The University of Chicago Press. OCLC 1415081070.
  - de Buck, Adriaan (1938). The Egyptian coffin texts II texts of spells 76-163. The University of Chicago Oriental Institute Publications. Chicago: The University of Chicago Press. OCLC 1415067081.
  - de Buck, Adriaan (1947). The Egyptian coffin texts III texts of spells 164-267. The University of Chicago Oriental Institute Publications. Chicago: The University of Chicago Press. OCLC 1415065745.
  - de Buck, Adriaan (1951). The Egyptian coffin texts IV texts of spells 268-354. The University of Chicago Oriental Institute Publications. Chicago: The University of Chicago Press. OCLC 1415089592.
  - de Buck, Adriaan (1954). The Egyptian coffin texts V texts of spells 355-471. The University of Chicago Oriental Institute Publications. Chicago: The University of Chicago Press. OCLC 1415186294.
  - de Buck, Adriaan (1956). The Egyptian coffin texts VI texts of spells 472-786. The University of Chicago Oriental Institute Publications. Chicago: The University of Chicago Press. OCLC 1415102447.
  - de Buck, Adriaan (1961). The Egyptian coffin texts VII texts of spells 787-1185. The University of Chicago Oriental Institute Publications. Chicago: The University of Chicago Press. OCLC 1401808096.
