= Felix Peiser =

German Assyriologist (1862–1921)

Felix Ernst Peiser
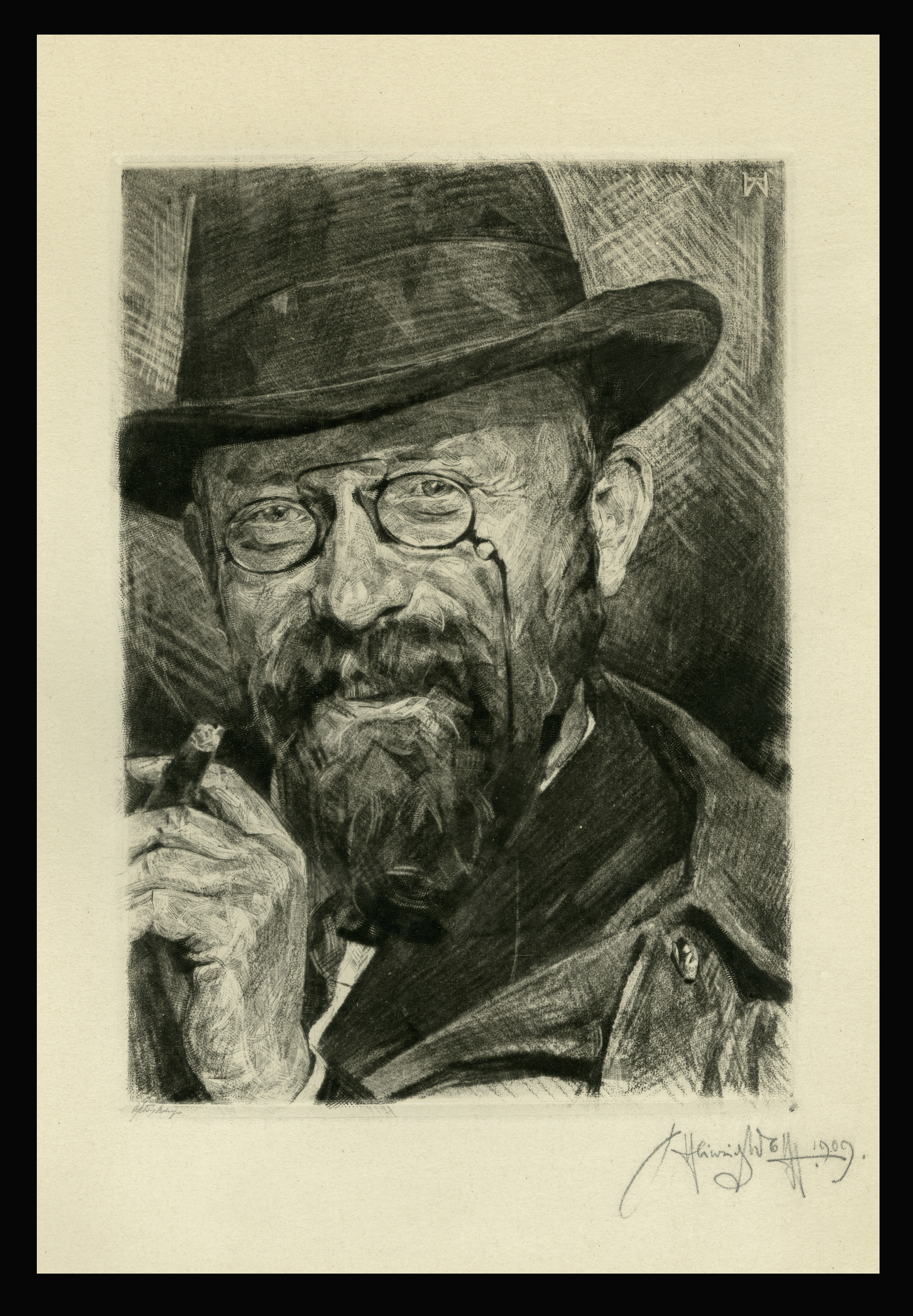
- Felix Peiser (1919)
- Born: 27 July 1862; Berlin
- Died: 24 April 1921 (aged 58); Königsberg in Preußen
- Education: Friedrich Wilhelm University Berlin, Leipzig University
- Scientific career
- Fields: Assyriology
- Workplaces: University of Königsberg

Felix Ernst Peiser (27 July 1862, in Berlin – 24 April 1921) was a German Assyriologist and specialist in Semitic languages.

== Life and work ==
Felix Peiser was born in Berlin to Jewish publisher and bookseller Wolf Peiser and his wife Rosalia Gottheil; his sister Bona was the first female librarian in Germany. Peiser was a student at Friedrich-Wilhelms-Universiteit in Berlin and Leipzig University. He obtained his doctorate in 1886 at Leipzig with a dissertation on the verb in Assyrian, and his habilitation in 1890 at Silezische Friedrich-Wilhelms-Universiteit in Breslau. From 1894 he taught Assyriology at Albertus-Universität Königsberg, first as Privatdozent, from 1905 as full professor.

During his early years at university, a number of important discoveries in Assyriology were made, which attracted Peiser to the field. In Berlin he studied with Eberhard Schrader, founding father of German Assyriology, in Leipzig with Assyriologist Friedrich Delitzsch and Arabist Heinrich Leberecht Fleischer. Even though the subject of his dissertation was linguistic and he was proficient in several Semitic languages (among which Hebrew and Arabic), he was most interested in historical research, just like his good friend Hugo Winckler (Assyriologist and excavator of Hattusa). Peiser published the texts from a Babylonian family archive that is kept partly in Berlin and partly in the British Museum. After his habilitation he was tasked with the publication of cuneiform judicial texts. He also published the texts of his own collection of clay tablets. His attempt to decipher the "Hittite hieroglyphs" was unsuccessful. Peiser also had an interest in the textual history of the Old Testament and published several studies on the subject.

In 1899 Peiser founded the Orientalistische Literaturzeitung, today the oldest existing scholarly journal on Ancient Near Eastern studies. He was also devoted to the history of the city where he lived, Königsberg in Preußen. From 1916 he was president of the important local history society Altertumsgesellschaft Prussia.

After his death, Peiser's collection of cuneiform tablets was bought by Franz Böhl, then professor in Groningen; it formed the start of the Böhl Collection, today the largest collection of cuneiform texts in the Netherlands.

== Selected publications ==
- Die assyrische Verbtafel. Dissertation Leipzig 1886.
- Jurisprudentiae Babylonicae quae supersunt. Habilitationsschrift Breslau 1890.
- Keilschriftliche Acten-Stücke aus babylonischen Städten. Von Steinen und Tafeln des Berliner Museums in Autographie, Transcription und Übersetzung. Wolf Peiser, Berlin 1889.
- Skizze der babylonischen Gesellschaft. Wolf Peiser, Berlin 1896.
- Der Prophet Habakuk. Eine Untersuchung zur Kritik des Alten Testaments. Wolf Peiser, Berlin 1903.
- with Emil Hollack: Das Gräberfeld von Moythienen. Gräfe & Unzer, Königsberg 1904.
- Das Gräberfeld von Pajki bei Praßnitz in Polen. Gräfe & Unzer, Königsberg 1916.
