= Beate Kampmann =

German physician and researcher

Beate Kampmann FRCPCH FMedSci
- Born: Hilden, Germany
- Education: University of Cologne (MD, Dr. med.); Imperial College London (PhD); University of London (DTM&H)
- Known for: Maternal and infant immunisation Vaccine evaluation Global child health research
- Awards: Fellow of the Royal College of Paediatrics and Child Health; Fellow of the Academy of Medical Sciences
- Medical career
- Field: Global health Paediatric infectious diseases Immunology; Vaccinology
- Institutions: Charité – Universitätsmedizin Berlin; London School of Hygiene & Tropical Medicine; Imperial College London; MRC Unit The Gambia

Beate Kampmann FRCPCH FMedSci is a German physician, academic, and vaccine researcher specialising in global health, paediatric infectious diseases, and immunology. She is Professor of Global Health (W3) at Charité – Universitätsmedizin Berlin and Professor of Paediatric Infection and Immunity at the London School of Hygiene & Tropical Medicine.

== Early life and education ==
Kampmann was born in Hilden, Germany. She completed her medical studies at the University of Cologne in 1988, where she also obtained her medical doctorate (Dr. med.) in 1989. She later moved to the United Kingdom, earning a PhD from Imperial College London in 1992 and a Diploma in Tropical Medicine and Hygiene (DTM&H) from the University of London in 1995.

== Academic and clinical career ==
Kampmann began her academic career as a Wellcome Trust Training Fellow in Clinical Tropical Medicine, working in the United Kingdom, the United States, and South Africa. She later held clinical and academic posts in paediatric infectious diseases at St Mary's Hospital, London, where she remained clinically active as part of the Consultant team until 2023.

She held a Senior NIHR Research Fellowship for research into childhood tuberculosis (2009-2014) and served as a Senior Investigator and Biomedical Research Lead for Paediatrics at the Academic Health Science Centre Imperial College, London.

From 2012 to 2018, she was Professor of Paediatric Infection and Immunity at Imperial College London and Director of the Centre for International Child Health. Between 2012 and 2023, she took on the position of Scientific Director of the Vaccines and Immunity Research Programme at the Medical Research Council (MRC) Unit The Gambia, where she led international vaccine and immunology research.

In 2018, Kampmann was appointed as Professor of Paediatric Infection and Immunity and Director of the Vaccine Centre at the London School of Hygiene & Tropical Medicine. In 2023, she moved to Berlin to take up an appointment to a Professorship in Global Health (W3) and the directorship of the Institute of International Health at Charité – Universitätsmedizin Berlin.

She is the founding director of the paediatric tuberculosis network in Europe (ptbnet) and the Immunising Pregnant Women and Infants (IMPRINT), an international research collaboration focused on maternal immunisation and neonatal immunisation.

== Awards and honours ==
- Fellow of the Royal College of Paediatrics and Child Health (2007)
- Recipient of the President's Medal for Excellence in Research Supervision, Imperial College London (2015)
- Foundation Award, Medical Research Council (2016)
- Ada Lovelace Lecturer at the Royal Institution (2017)
- Fellow of the Academy of Medical Sciences (2021)
- Fellow of the West African College of Physicians (2021)
