= The Netherlands Institute for the Near East =

Research institute in the Netherlands

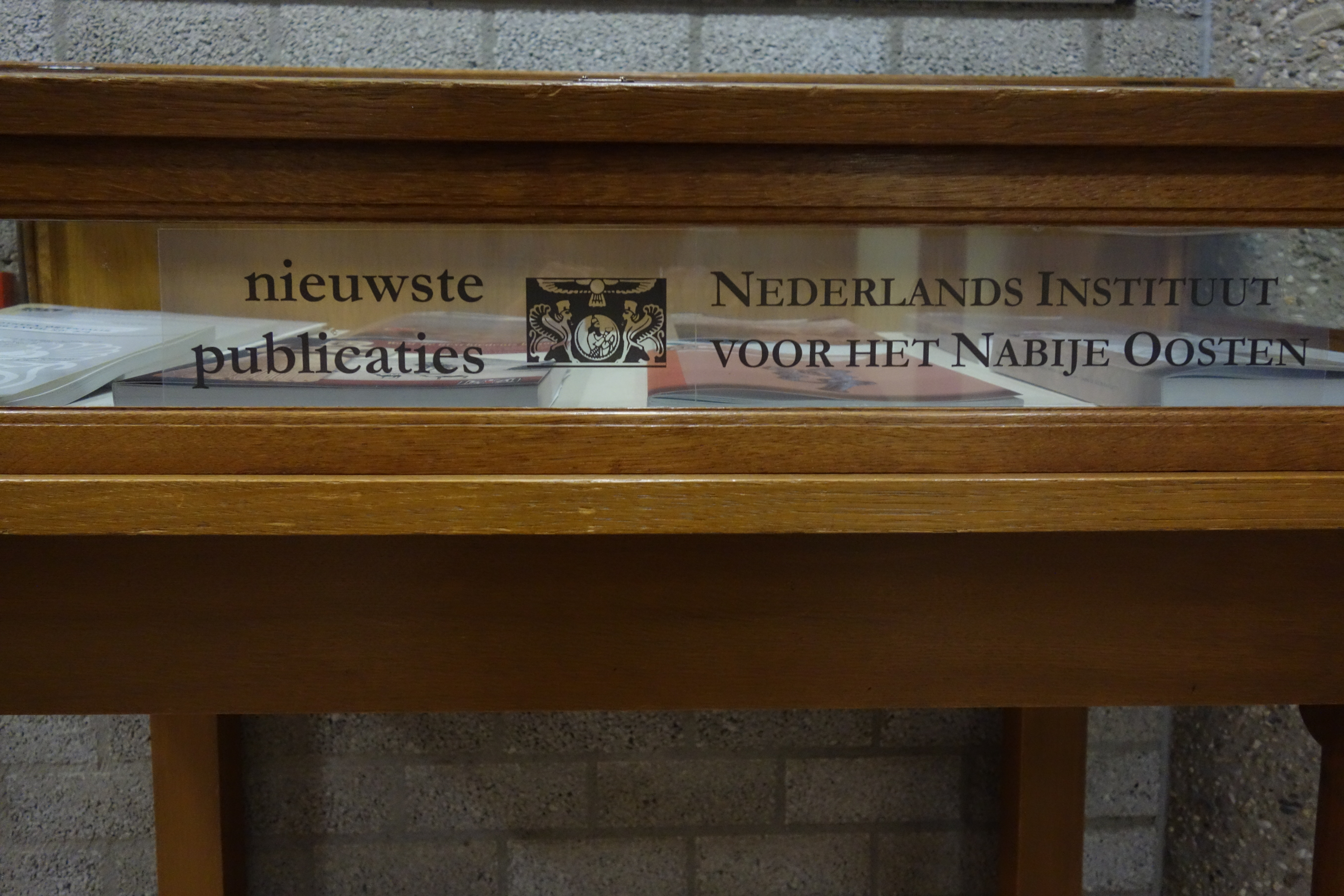
NINO, Leiden

The Netherlands Institute for the Near East (Dutch: Nederlands Instituut voor het Nabije Oosten; colloquially known by its abbreviation: NINO) is an institution for the advancement of the study of the Ancient Near East, Mesopotamia, Anatolia, and Egypt. It is internationally known for its library collections and collection of cuneiform inscriptions.

== History ==
NINO was independently founded in 1939 and housed at Noordeindsplein 4a in Leiden on the initiative of Arie Kampman, closely linked to the Dutch oriental society "Ex Oriente Lux". Its first co-directors were Frans de Liagre Böhl and Adriaan de Buck, professors of Assyriology and Egyptology, respectively, at Leiden University. The Online Egyptological Bibliography was edited at NINO 1947–2009. In 1955 Kampman was appointed director. The institute maintained close ties to Leiden University, moving into the Faculty of Humanities' newly built Witte Singel complex in 1982.

An agreement for close cooperation, effective 2018, with Leiden University and the National Museum of Antiquities (Leiden) was signed, integrating NINO into the University's Faculty of Humanities. As part of its transformation, the institute started a funding programme (a.o. mobility grants, conference subsidies). In 2024 the offices and library of NINO moved into the newly renovated Herta Mohr building of Leiden University's Faculty of Humanities.

== Library ==
From its inception, the NINO library aimed to be a complete research library in the fields of Assyriology, Egyptology, Near Eastern Archaeology and related fields. As of 2024 it holds ca. 50.000 titles (scientific books and journals). The NINO library collections have been integrated in Leiden University Libraries from 2018, as part of the University's Middle Eastern Library which opened in 2024.

== Publications ==
NINO publishes the journal Bibliotheca Orientalis and the annuary Anatolica. Its current monograph series are PIHANS, Egyptological Publications and Achaemenid History.

== Collections ==
The institute holds several collections, including:

- the De Liagre Böhl Collection, which incorporates the largest collection of cuneiform tablets in the Netherlands. Some highlights from the Böhl Collection are on display at the nearby National Museum of Antiquities;
- the Frank Scholten Collection, a collection of ca. 14.000 negatives and ca. 13.000 photographic prints photographed in Palestine 1921–1923;
- the De Buck Archive;
- glass slides photographed ca. 1920s–1950;
- archives of NINO 1939–2018.
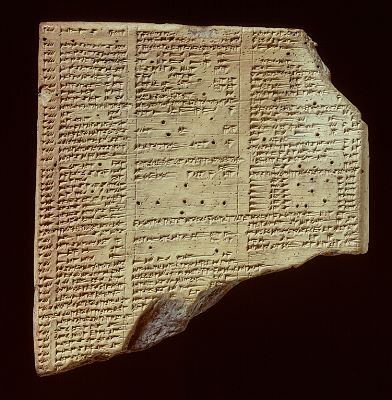
Clay tablet from the library of Assurbanipal at Nineveh (Böhl Collection)

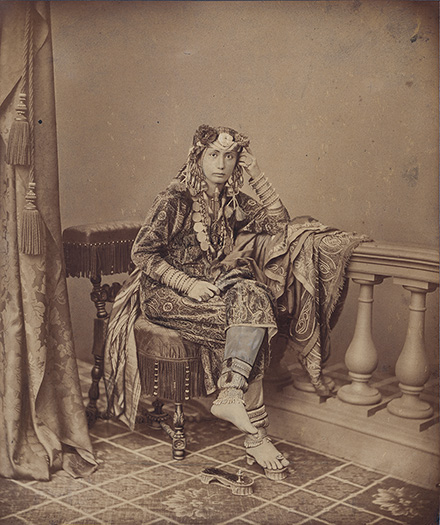
Emily Ruete/Sayyida Salma (Saïd Ruete Collection)

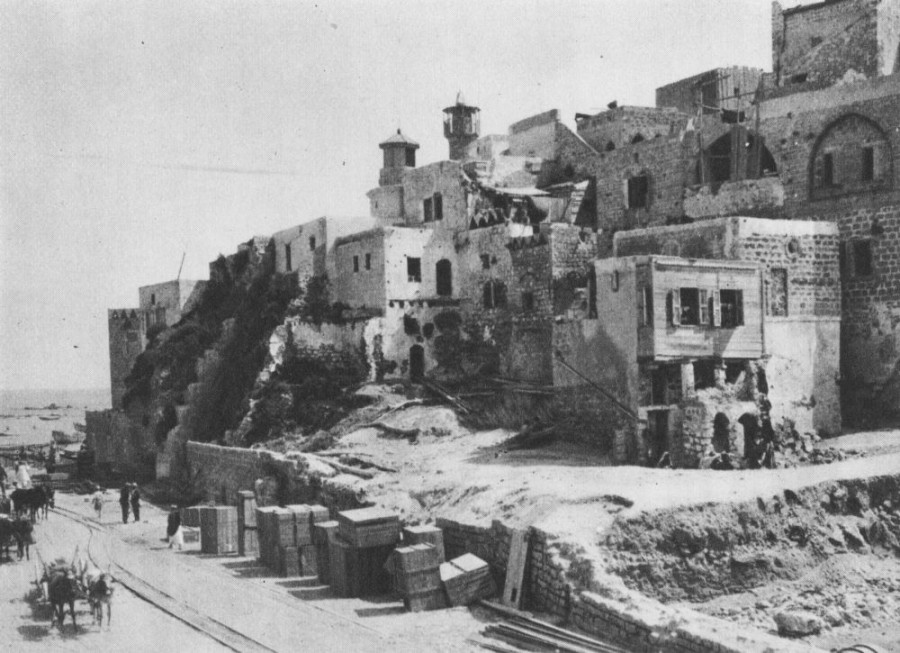
Photograph of Palestine, ca. 1921 (Frank Scholten Collection)

== Subsidiary institute in Turkey ==
The Nederlands Instituut in Turkije (NIT) was founded in 1958 as NINO's subsidiary institute in Istanbul. It was integrated into Leiden University's Faculty of Humanities in 2022.
