= Simon ben Judah Löb Peiser =

18th-century Polish rabbi and scholar

Simon ben Judah Löb Peiser (Hebrew: שמעון בן יהודה ליב פייזר; born c. 1690 in Peisern) was a rabbi and scholar active in Lissa, Poland.

He is known as the author of Naḥalat Shim'oni, a reference work divided into four sections:

1. A Biblical onomasticon, referencing all aggadot found in Babylonian Talmud, Midrash Rabbah, and the Five Megillot, with marginal notes titled ‘En Rogel, which provide references to parallel passages;
2. An onomasticon of all the rabbis of the Mishnah who appear in the Babylonian Talmud;
3. An onomasticon of the rabbis of the baraitot; and
4. An onomasticon of the Amoraim.

The first two sections were published in Wandsbeck in 1728. The third and fourth sections, as well as a Talmudic methodology, remained unpublished.
