= Arie Abraham Kampman =

Dutch scholar (1911–1977)

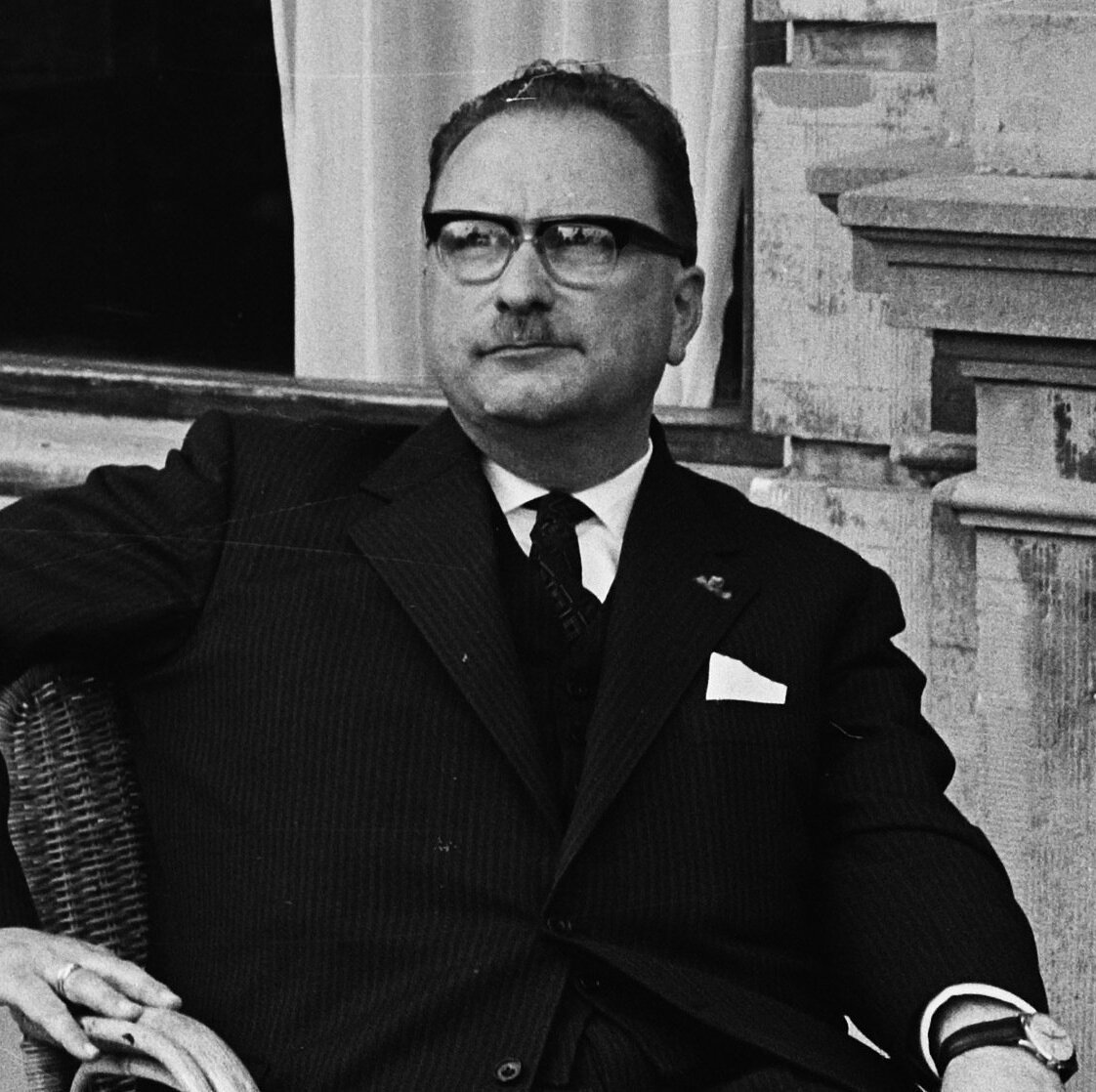
- Dr. A.A. Kampman in 1963
- Born: 6 July 1911; Dordrecht
- Died: 23 September 1977 (aged 66); Bemelen
- Education: Leiden University
- Organization(s): NINO, NHAI

Arie Abraham "Ary" Kampman (6 July 1911 in Dordrecht – 23 September 1977 in Bemelen) was a Dutch scholar of Ancient Near Eastern studies, an initiator of scholarly societies and journals, and a secondary school teacher. Kampman obtained his Dutch PhD degree with professor Frans de Liagre Böhl on the 1945 thesis De historische beteekenis der Hethietische vestingbouwkunde (translated title: The historical significance of Hittite fortification). In 1939 he was a founder of the Nederlands Archaeologisch Instituut voor het Nabije Oosten (translation: Dutch Archeological Institute for the Near East), the predecessor of the present The Netherlands Institute for the Near East.

== Publications ==
Kampman's publications include:

- "Schets der Hethietische Geschiedenis en Beschaving", in Jaarbericht Ex Oriente Lux 6 (1939), pp. 177-201. In Dutch.
- "Archieven en bibliotheken in het Nabije Oosten", in Handelingen van het 6de Wetenschappelijk Vlaamsch Congres voor Boek- en Bibliotheekwezen. Gent, 31 maart 1940 (Schoten-Antwerpen: Lombaerts, 1942). In Dutch.
- De historische beteekenis der Hethietische vestingbouwkunde. Dissertation 1945; published in Kernmomenten der Antieke Beschaving (Mededelingen en verhandelingen van het Vooraziatisch-Egyptisch Gezelschap "Ex Oriente Lux" (MVEOL) 7, 1947), pp. 75-144. In Dutch.
- "Van kruisridders en kooplieden: de Nederlanders en de Levant van A.D. 1200-1720", in Jaarbericht Ex Oriente Lux 12 (1951-1952), pp. 121-162. In Dutch.
- Klein-Azië: Archaeologie der hethietische rijken 1950-1953. Leiden: E.J. Brill, 1954. In Dutch.
- "Kruisridderburchten in het Midden-Oosten", in Varia Historica. Aangeboden aan Prof. Dr. A.W. Byvanck t.g.v. zijn zeventigste verjaardag door de Historische Kring te Leiden I (Assen: Van Gorcum, 1954), 129-149. In Dutch.
- with Flugi van Aspermont, C.H.C.: De Johanniter-Orde in het Heilige Land (1100-1292): een boek voor Johanniter- en Maltezer ridders en liefhebbers van geschiedenis. Assen: Van Gorcum, 1957. In Dutch.
- Het Midden-Oosten: centrum der wereld (Phoenix pockets; 18). Zeist: De Haan; Antwerpen: Standaard Boekhandel, 1959. In Dutch.
- (ed.): 7000 jaar Perzische kunst. Catalogue of an exhibition held at the Kunstmuseum Den Haag (formerly Gemeentemuseum, The Hague), 1962. In Dutch.
- with Van Luttervelt, R. (eds.): Herdenkingstentoonstelling 350 jaar Nederland-Turkije, 1612-1962. Catalogue of an exhibition held at the Rijksmuseum (Amsterdam), 1962.
- "Zwei Bildwerke aus dem hethitischen Imperium in Leiden", in Bulletin Antieke Beschaving 39 (1964), pp. 55-56. In Dutch.
- with Van der Ploeg, J.P.M. (eds.): Compte rendu de l'onzième rencontre assyriologique internationale organisée à Leiden du 23 au 29 juin 1962. Leiden: NINO, 1964. In French.
- "Nederlands-Perzische betrekkingen in de Gouden Eeuw, Nederlandse kooplieden en kunstenaars te Isfahan", in Persica 5 (1970-1971), pp. 5-14. In Dutch.
- with Beek, M.A., Nijland, C., and Ryckmans, J. (eds.): Symbolae biblicae et Mesopotamicae Francisco Mario Theodoro de Liagre Böhl dedicatae (Studia Scholten; 4). Leiden: E.J. Brill, 1973. Festschrift for his teacher professor Frans de Liagre Böhl, with an extensive bibliography of De Liagre Böhl's work.
- various articles in (Dutch) journals and encyclopaedias.

== Sources ==
- Beek, Martinus Adrianus, "Arie Abraham Kampman, Dordrecht 6 juli 1911 - Bemelen 23 september 1977". Jaarboek van de Maatschappij der Nederlandse Letterkunde, 1979, p. 58.
- Borger, Rykle, "Arie Abraham Kampman (6. Juli 1911 bis 23. September 1977)"]. Archiv für Orientforschung 26 (1978-1979), p. 237. JSTOR 41637431. In German.
- Byvanck-Quarles van Ufford, H.A.L.E., "In Memoriam Arie Abraham Kampman 1911-1977". Babesch 52-53 (1977-1978), p. VII-VIII.
- Eggermont, P.H.L. , "In Memoriam Prof. Dr A.A. Kampman". Persica 7 (1975-1978), p. VII-X.
- Nijland, C., "In Memoriam Arie Abraham Kampman". BiOr 34 (1977), p. I-IV; Anatolica 5 (1973-1976), p. 1-6.
- Taylor, S.S., Spruytenburg, M. (eds.), "Kampman, Arie A." in Who's who in the Netherlands 1962/1963 (Amsterdam 1963), p. 380.
- Veenhof, Klaas R. , "In Memoriam Arie Abraham Kampman". Phoenix 24,1 (1978), p. 4-9.
- van Zoest, C.H., Berntsen, S.R.L., 75 jaar NINO. Geschiedenis van het Instituut in hoofdlijnen, in: Waar de geschiedenis begon. Nederlandse onderzoekers in de ban van spijkerschrift, hiërogliefen en aardewerk. Uitgave naar aanleiding van het 75-jarig bestaan van het Nederlands Instituut voor het Nabije Oosten, 1939-2014. Leiden, 2014, 3-29.
- Untitled biographic preface in auction catalogue: Book auction sale 6th and 7th November 1979. The library of the late Prof. Dr. A.A. Kampman. Archaeology, art, history, civilization of the ancient world especially of the Mediterranean area. J.L. Beijers, Utrecht.
