= Milsbeek =

- Village
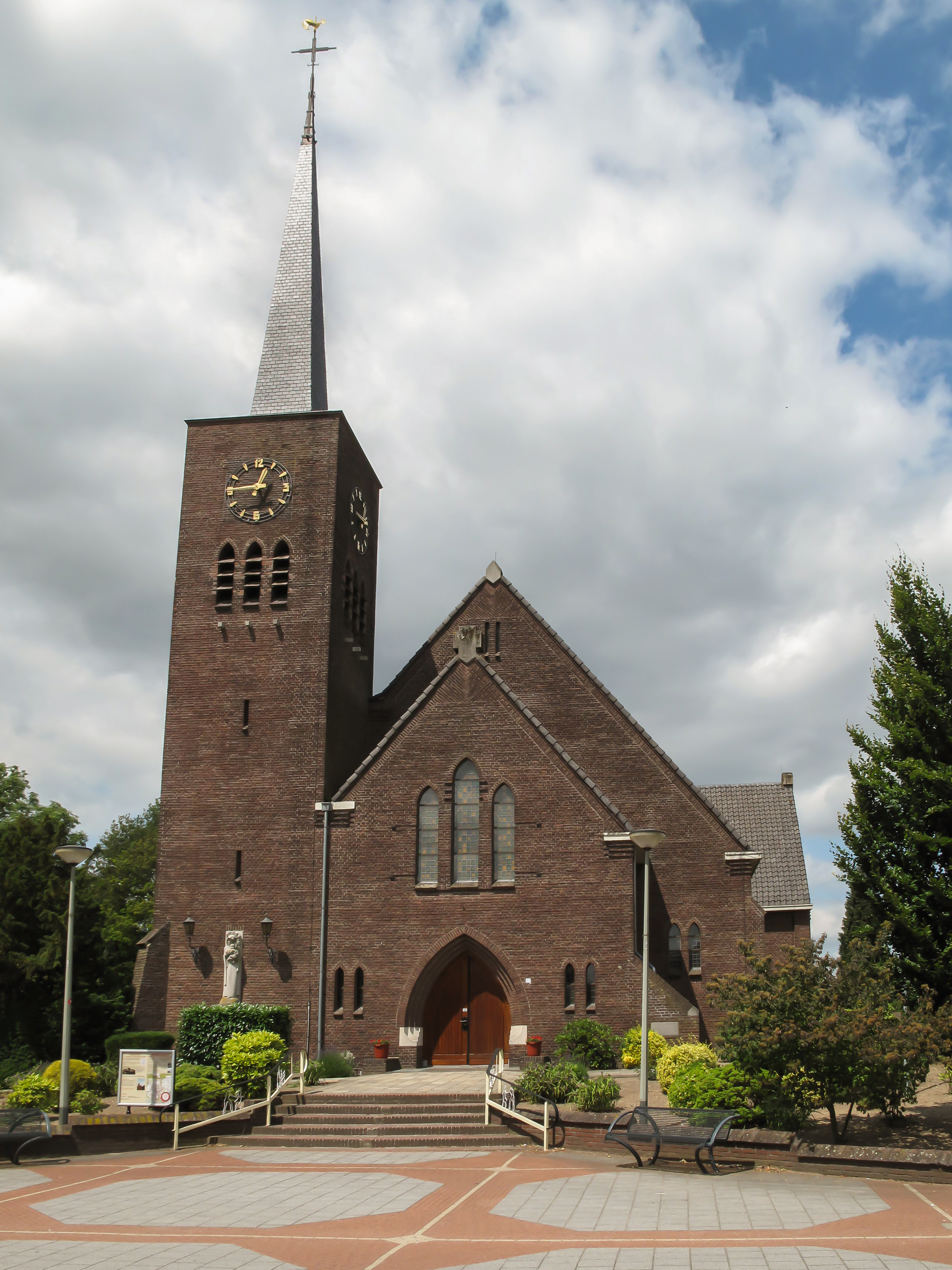
- Church of Milsbeek

- Location in the Netherlands Location in the province of Limburg in the Netherlands
- Coordinates: 51°43′36″N 5°56′52″E
- Country: Netherlands
- Province: Limburg
- Municipality: Gennep

Area
  - Total: 4.55 km^{2} (1.76 sq mi)
- Elevation: 173 m (568 ft)

Population (2021)
  - Total: 1,015
  - Density: 223/km^{2} (578/sq mi)
- Time zone: UTC+1 (CET)
  - Summer (DST): UTC+2 (CEST)
- Postal code: 6596
- Dialing code: 0485
- Major roads: N271

Milsbeek is a village in the Dutch province of Limburg. It is a part of the municipality of Gennep, and lies about 14 km southeast of Nijmegen.

The village was first mentioned in 1329 as Milsbeec, and is named after a brook.

Milsbeek was home to 520 people in 1840. The former pottery was turned into a pottery museum in 2016, and has to last remaining wood oven of the Netherlands.

== Gallery ==
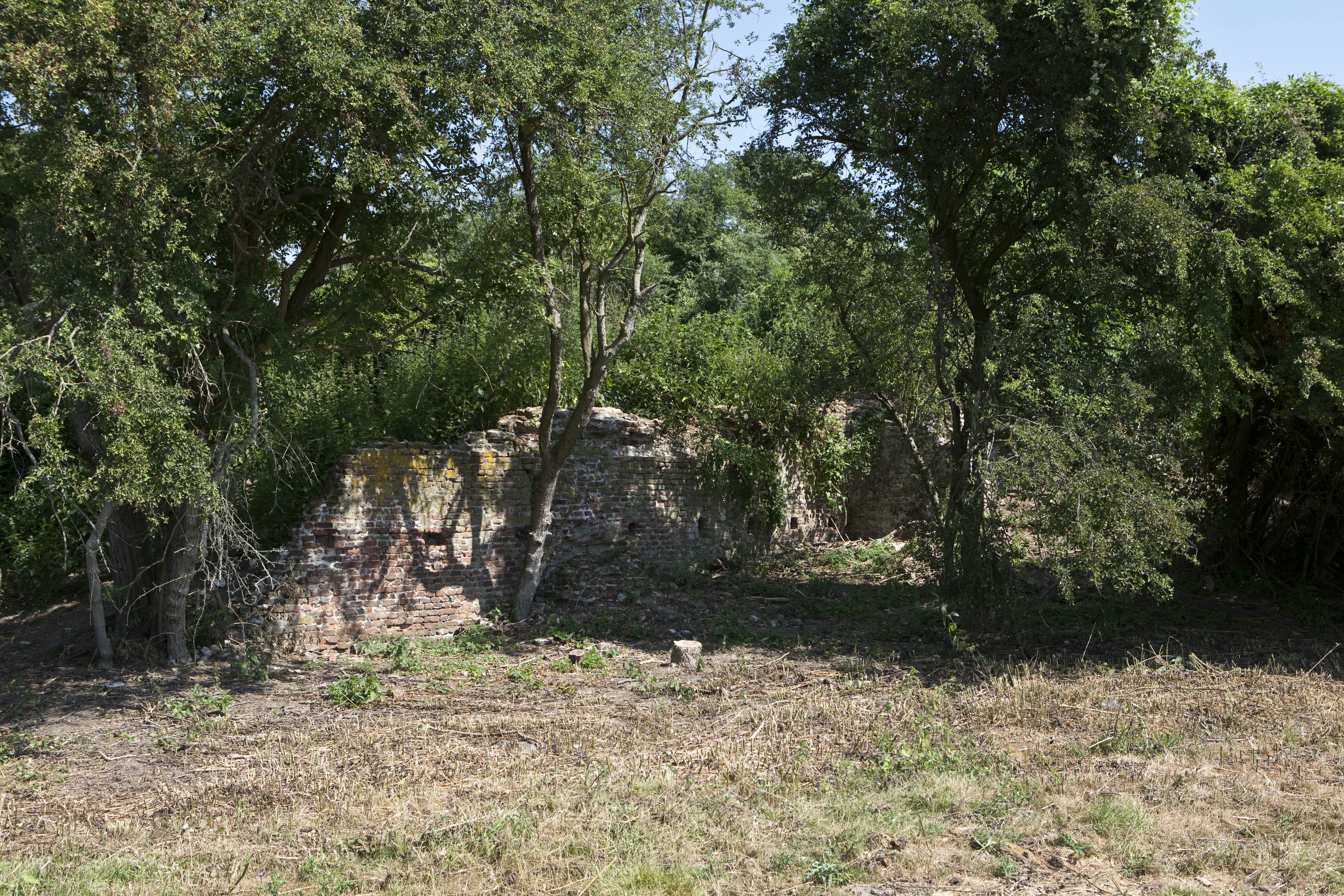
Ruins of Gennerperhuis

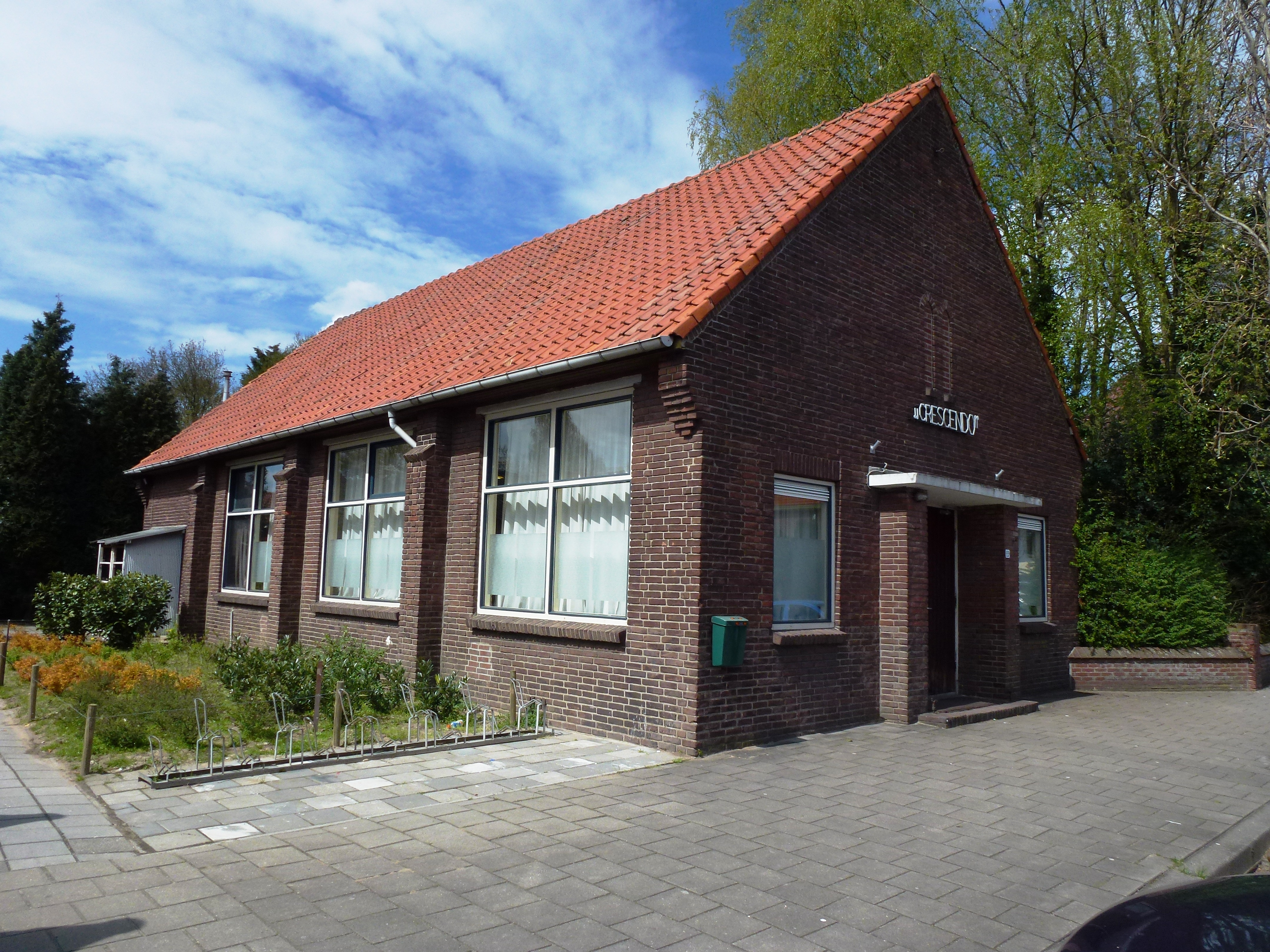
Community house

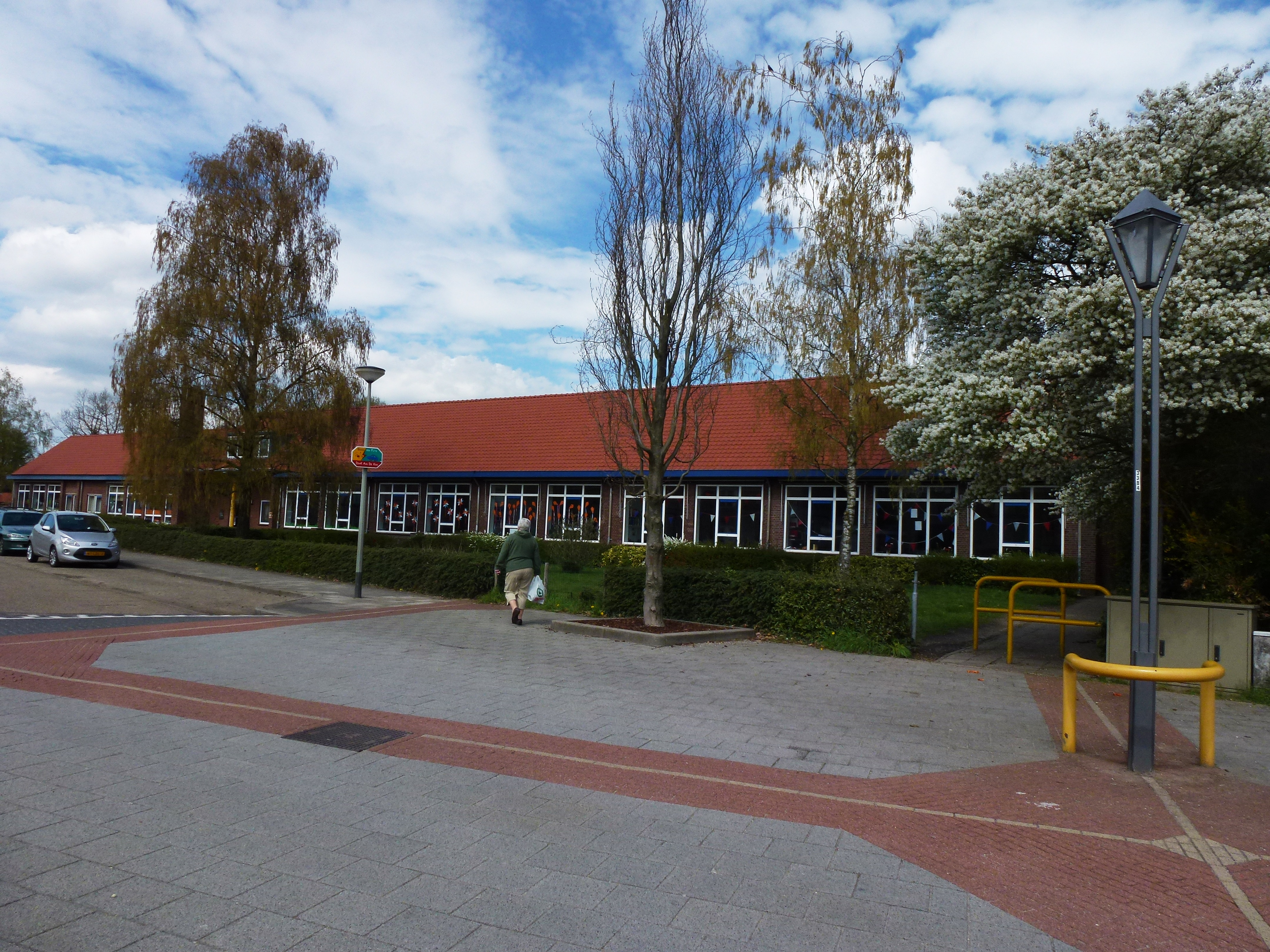
School

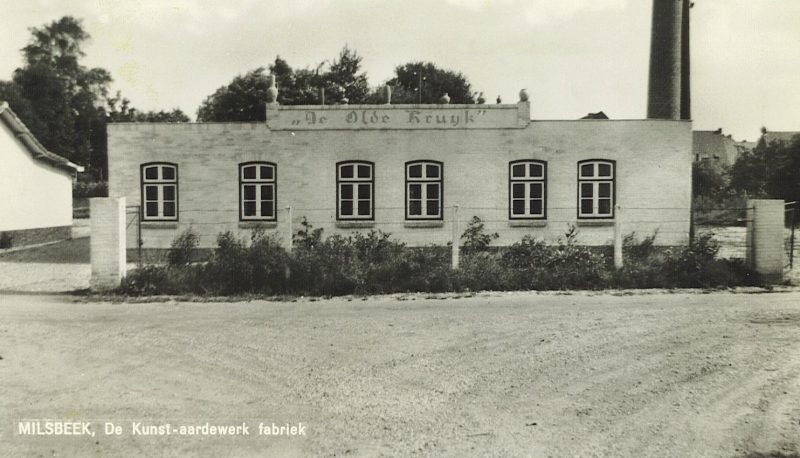
Former pottery (1955)
