= William Whiston =

English theologian, historian, translator and mathematician (1667–1752)

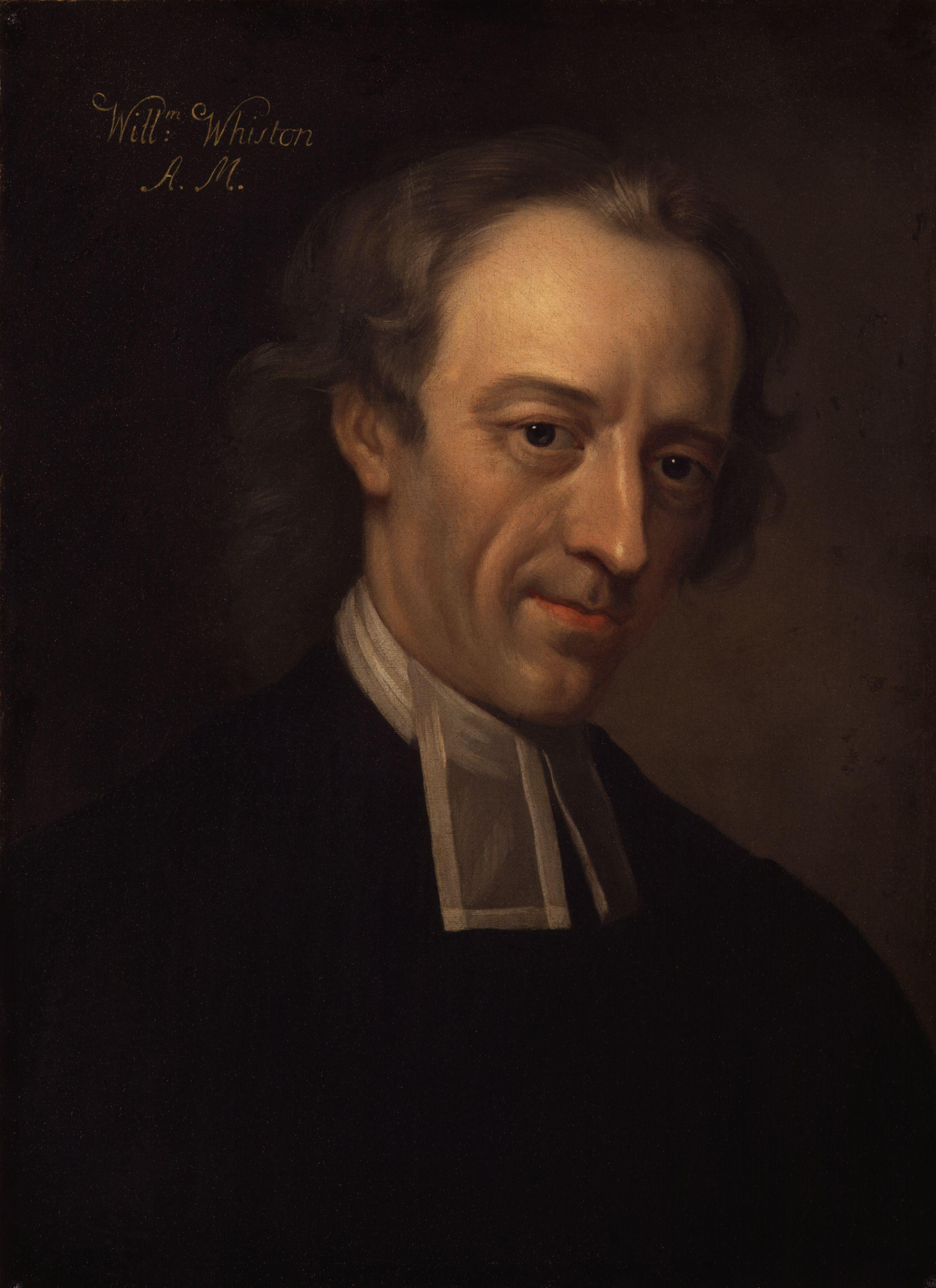
- Portrait by Sarah Hoadly, c. 1720
- Born: 9 December 1667; Norton-juxta-Twycross, Leicestershire, England
- Died: 22 August 1752 (aged 84); Lyndon, Rutland, England
- Education: Clare College, Cambridge
- Known for: Translating the works of Josephus, catastrophism, isoclinic maps, work on longitude
- Scientific career
- Fields: Mathematics, theology
- Workplaces: Clare College, Cambridge
- Academic advisors: Isaac Newton; Robert Herne
- Notable students: James Jurin

William Whiston (9 December 1667 – 22 August 1752) was an English theologian, historian, natural philosopher, and mathematician, a leading figure in the popularisation of the ideas of Isaac Newton. He is now probably best known for helping to instigate the Longitude Act in 1714 (and his attempts to win the rewards that it promised) and his important translations of the Antiquities of the Jews and other works by Josephus (which are still in print). He was a prominent exponent of Arianism and wrote A New Theory of the Earth.

Whiston succeeded his mentor Newton as Lucasian Professor of Mathematics at the University of Cambridge. In 1710 he lost the professorship and was expelled from the university as a result of his unorthodox religious views. Whiston rejected the notion of eternal torment in hellfire, which he viewed as absurd, cruel, and an insult to God. What especially pitted him against church authorities was his denial of the doctrine of the Trinity, which he believed had pagan origins.

== Early life and career ==
Whiston was born to Josiah Whiston (1622–1685) and Katherine Rosse (1639–1701) at Norton-juxta-Twycross, in Leicestershire, where his father was rector. His mother was daughter of the previous rector at Norton-juxta-Twycross, Gabriel Rosse. Josiah Whiston was a presbyterian, but retained his rectorship after the Stuart Restoration in 1660. William Whiston was educated privately, for his health, and so that he could act as amanuensis to his blind father. He studied at Queen Elizabeth Grammar School at Tamworth, Staffordshire. After his father's death, he entered Clare College, Cambridge as a sizar in 1686. He applied himself to mathematical study, was awarded the degree of Bachelor of Arts (BA) (1690), and AM (1693), and was elected Fellow in 1691 and probationary senior Fellow in 1693.

William Lloyd ordained Whiston at Lichfield in 1693. In 1694, claiming ill health, he resigned his tutorship at Clare to Richard Laughton, chaplain to John Moore, the bishop of Norwich, and swapped positions with him. He now divided his time between Norwich, Cambridge and London. In 1698 Moore gave him the living of Lowestoft where he became rector. In 1699 he resigned his Fellowship of Clare College and left to marry.

Whiston first met Isaac Newton in 1694 and attended some of his lectures, though he first found them, by his own admission, incomprehensible. Encouraged after reading a paper by David Gregory on Newtonian philosophy, he set out to master Newton's Principia mathematica thereafter. He and Newton became friends. In 1701 Whiston resigned his living to become Isaac Newton's substitute, giving the Lucasian lectures at Cambridge. He succeeded Newton as Lucasian professor in 1702. There followed a period of joint research with Roger Cotes, appointed with Whiston's patronage to the Plumian professorship in 1706. Students at the Cotes–Whiston experimental philosophy course included Stephen Hales, William Stukeley, and Joseph Wasse.

== Newtonian theologian ==
In 1707 Whiston was Boyle lecturer; this lecture series was at the period a significant opportunity for Newton's followers, including Richard Bentley and Samuel Clarke, to express their views, especially in opposition to the rise of deism. The "Newtonian" line came to include, with Bentley, Clarke and Whiston in particular, a defence of natural law by returning to the definition of Augustine of Hippo of a miracle (a cause of human wonderment), rather than the prevailing concept of a divine intervention against nature, which went back to Anselm. This move was intended to undermine arguments of deists and sceptics. The Boyle lectures dwelt on the connections between biblical prophecies, dramatic physical events such as floods and eclipses, and their explanations in terms of science. On the other hand, Whiston was alive to possible connections of prophecy with current affairs: the War of the Spanish Succession, and later the Jacobite rebellions.

Whiston supported a qualified biblical literalism: the literal meaning should be the default, unless there was a good reason to think otherwise. This view again went back to Augustine. Newton's attitude to the cosmogony of Thomas Burnet reflected on the language of the Genesis creation narrative; as did Whiston's alternative cosmogony. Moses as author of Genesis was not necessarily writing as a natural philosopher, nor as a law-giver, but for a particular audience. The new cosmogonies of Burnet, Whiston and John Woodward were all criticised for their disregard of the biblical account, by John Arbuthnot, John Edwards and William Nicolson in particular.

The title for Whiston's Boyle lectures was The Accomplishment of Scripture Prophecies. Rejecting typological interpretation of biblical prophecy, he argued that the meaning of a prophecy must be unique. His views were later challenged by Anthony Collins. There was a more immediate attack by Nicholas Clagett in 1710. One reason prophecy was topical was the Camisard movement that saw French exiles ("French prophets") in England. Whiston had started writing on the millenarianism that was integral to the Newtonian theology, and wanted to distance his views from theirs, and in particular from those of John Lacy. Meeting the French prophets in 1713, Whiston developed the view that the charismatic gift of revelation could be demonic possession.

=== Tensions with Newton ===
It is no longer assumed that Whiston's Memoirs are completely trustworthy on the matter of his personal relations with Newton. One view is that the relationship was never very close, Bentley being more involved in Whiston's appointment to the Lucasian chair; and that it deteriorated as soon as Whiston began to write on prophecy, publishing Essay on the Revelation of St John (1706). This work proclaimed the millennium for the year 1716.

Whiston's 1707 edition of Newton's Arithmetica Universalis did nothing to improve matters. Newton himself was heavily if covertly involved in the 1722 edition, nominally due to John Machin, making many changes.

In 1708–9 Whiston was engaging Thomas Tenison and John Sharp as archbishops in debates on the Trinity. There is evidence from Hopton Haynes that Newton reacted by pulling back from publication on the issue; his antitrinitarian views, from the 1690s, were finally published in 1754 as An Historical Account of Two Notable Corruptions of Scripture.

Whiston was never a Fellow of the Royal Society. In conversation with Edmond Halley he blamed his reputation as a "heretick". Also, though, he claimed Newton had disliked having an independent-minded disciple; and was unnaturally cautious and suspicious by nature.

== Unorthodox religious views ==
=== Expelled Arian ===
Whiston's route to rejection of the Nicene Creed, the historical orthodox position against Arianism, began early in his tenure of the Lucasian chair as he followed hints from Samuel Clarke. He read also in Louis Ellies Dupin, and the Explication of Gospel Theism (1706) of Richard Brocklesby. His study of the Apostolic Constitutions then convinced him that Arianism was the creed of the early church.

The general election of 1710 brought the Tories solid political power for a number of years, up to the Hanoverian succession of 1714. Their distrust of theological innovation had a direct impact on Whiston, as well as others of similar views. His heterodoxy was notorious. In 1710 he was deprived of his professorship and expelled from the university.

The matter was not allowed to rest there: Whiston tried to get a hearing before Convocation. He did have defenders even in the high church ranks, such as George Smalridge. For political reasons, this development would have been divisive at the time. Queen Anne made a point of twice "losing" the papers in the case. After her death in 1714 the intended hearing was allowed to drop. The party passions of these years found an echo in Henry Sacheverell's attempt to exclude Whiston from his church of St Andrew's, Holborn, taking place in 1719.

=== "Primitive Christianity" and other religious scholarship ===
Portrait of Whiston, early 18th century

Whiston founded a society for promoting primitive Christianity, lecturing in support of his theories in halls and coffee-houses at London, Bath, and Tunbridge Wells. Those he involved included Thomas Chubb, Thomas Emlyn, John Gale, Benjamin Hoadley, Arthur Onslow, and Thomas Rundle. There were meetings at Whiston's house from 1715 to 1717; Hoadley avoided coming, as did Samuel Clarke, though invited. A meeting with Clarke, Hoadley, John Craig and Gilbert Burnet the younger had left these leading latitudinarians unconvinced about Whiston's reliance on the Apostolical Constitutions.

Franz Woken wrote a 1728 Latin work on Whiston's view of primitive Christianity. His challenge to the teachings of Athanasius meant that Whiston was commonly considered heretical on many points. On the other hand, he was a firm believer in supernatural aspects of Christianity. He defended prophecy and miracle. He supported anointing the sick and touching for the king's evil. His dislike of rationalism in religion also made him one of the numerous opponents of Hoadley's Plain Account of the Nature and End of the Sacrament. He was fervent in his views of ecclesiastical government and discipline, derived from the Apostolical Constitutions.

Around 1747, when his clergyman began to read the Athanasian Creed, which Whiston did not believe in, he physically left the church and the Anglican communion, becoming a Baptist.

By the 1720s, some dissenters and early Unitarians viewed Whiston as a role model. The series of Moyer Lectures often made Whiston's unorthodox views a particular target.

Whiston held that Song of Solomon was apocryphal and that the Book of Baruch was not. He modified the biblical Ussher chronology, setting the Creation at 4010 BCE. He challenged Newton's system of The Chronology of Ancient Kingdoms Amended (1728). Westfall absolves Whiston of the charge that he pushed for the posthumous publication of the Chronology just to attack it, commenting that the heirs were in any case looking to publish manuscripts of Newton, who died in 1727.

Whiston's advocacy of clerical monogamy is referenced in Oliver Goldsmith's novel The Vicar of Wakefield. His last "famous discovery, or rather revival of Dr Giles Fletcher, the Elder's," which he mentions in his autobiography, was the identification of the Tatars with the lost tribes of Israel.

== Scientific lecturer and popular author ==
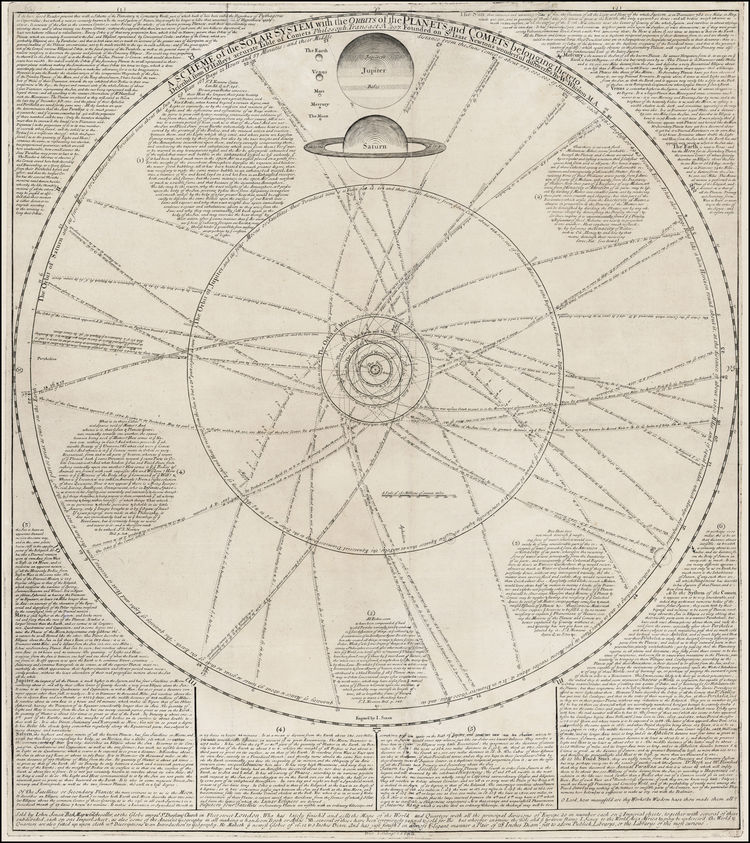
Solar System chart by William Whiston and John Senex

Whiston began lecturing on natural philosophy in London. He gave regular courses at coffee houses, particularly Button's, and also at the Censorium, a set of riverside meeting rooms in London run by Richard Steele. At Button's, he gave courses of demonstration lectures on astronomical and physical phenomena, and Francis Hauksbee the younger worked with him on experimental demonstrations. His passing remarks on religious topics were sometimes objected to, for example by Henry Newman of the SPCK writing to Steele.

His lectures were often accompanied by publications. In 1712, he published, with John Senex, a chart of the Solar System showing numerous paths of comets. In 1715, he lectured on the total solar eclipse of 3 May 1715 (which fell in April Old Style in England); Whiston lectured on it at the time, in Covent Garden, and later, as a natural event and as a portent.

By 1715 Whiston had also become adept at newspaper advertising. He frequently lectured to the Royal Society.

=== Longitude ===
In 1714, he was instrumental in the passing of the Longitude Act, which established the Board of Longitude. In collaboration with Humphrey Ditton he published A New Method for Discovering the Longitude, both at Sea and Land, which was widely referenced and discussed. For the next forty years he continued to propose a range of methods to solve the longitude reward, which earned him widespread ridicule, particularly from the group of writers known as the Scriblerians. In one proposal for using magnetic dip to find longitude he produced one of the first isoclinic maps of southern England in 1719 and 1721. In 1734, he proposed using the eclipses of Jupiter's satellites.

=== Broader natural philosophy ===
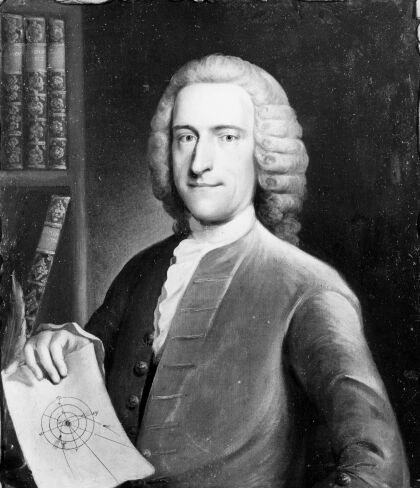
A portrait of William Whiston with a diagram demonstrating his theories of cometary catastrophism, described in A New Theory of the Earth

Whiston's A New Theory of the Earth from its Original to the Consummation of All Things (1696) was an articulation of creationism and flood geology. It held that the global flood of Noah had been caused by a comet. The work obtained the praise of John Locke, who classed the author among those who, if not adding much to our knowledge, "At least bring some new things to our thoughts." He was an early advocate, along with Edmond Halley, of the periodicity of comets; he also held that comets were responsible for past catastrophes in Earth's history. In 1736, he caused widespread anxiety among London's citizens when he predicted the world would end on 16 October that year because a comet would hit the earth. William Wake as Archbishop of Canterbury officially denied this prediction to calm the public.

There was no consensus within the Newtonians as to how far mechanical causes could be held responsible for key events of sacred history: John Keill was at the opposite extreme to Whiston in minimising such causes. As a natural philosopher, Whiston's speculations respected no boundary with his theological views. He saw the creation of man as an intervention in the natural order. He picked up on Arthur Ashley Sykes's advice to Samuel Clarke to omit an eclipse and earthquake mentioned by Phlegon of Tralles from future editions of Clarke's Boyle lectures, these events being possibly synchronous with Christ's crucifixion. Whiston published The Testimony of Phlegon Vindicated in 1732.

== Personal life and death ==
Whiston married Ruth, daughter of George Antrobus, his headmaster at Tamworth school. He died in Lyndon Hall, Rutland, at the home of his son-in-law, Samuel Barker, on 22 August 1752. He was survived by his children Sarah, William, George, and John.

== Works ==
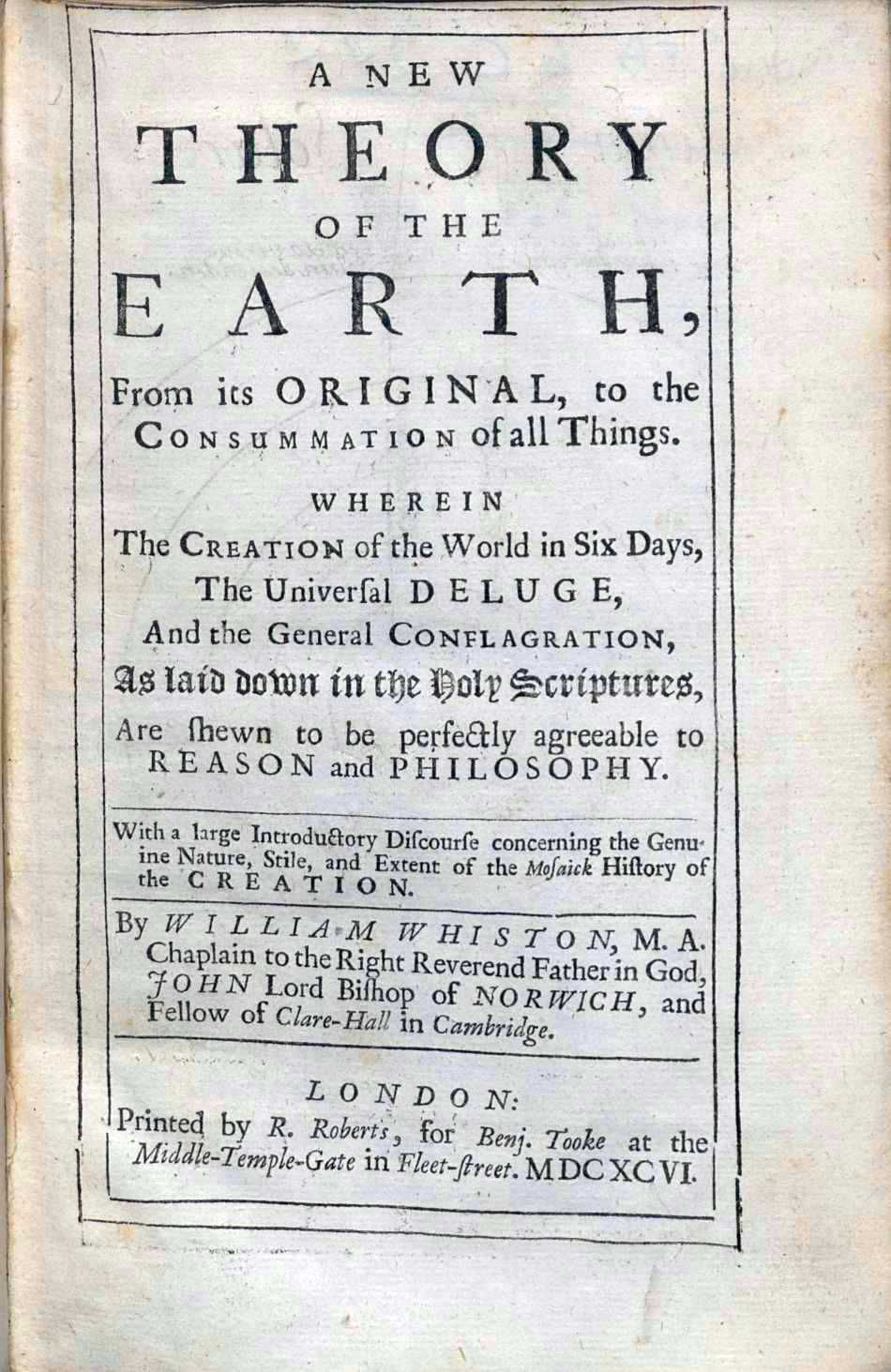
New theory of the Earth, 1696

Whiston's later life was spent in continual controversy: theological, mathematical, chronological, and miscellaneous. He vindicated his estimate of the Apostolical Constitutions and the Arian views he had derived from them in his Primitive Christianity Revived (5 vols., 1711–1712). In 1713 he produced a reformed liturgy. His Life of Samuel Clarke appeared in 1730.

In 1727 he published a two volume work called Authentik Record belonging to the Old and New Testament. This was a collection of translations and essays on various deuterocanonical books, pseudepigrapha and other essays with a translation if relevant.

Whiston translated the complete works of Josephus into English, and published them along with his own notes and dissertations under the title The Genuine Works of Flavius Josephus the Jewish Historian in 1737. This translation was based on the same Greek edition of Josephus' works used by Siwart Haverkamp in his prior translation. The text on which Whiston's translation of Josephus is based is, reputedly, one which had many errors in transcription. In 1745 he published his Primitive New Testament (on the basis of Codex Bezae and Codex Claromontanus).

Whiston left memoirs (3 vols., 1749–1750). These do not contain the account of the proceedings taken against him at Cambridge for his antitrinitarianism, which was published separately at the time.

=== Editions ===
- New theory of the Earth. London: Robert Roberts. 1696.
- New theory of the Earth (in German). Frankfurt am Main: Christian Gottlieb Ludwig. 1713.

== See also ==
- Noah's Flood
- Catastrophism
- Biblical prophecy
- Dorsa Whiston, a lunar ridge named after him
