= James Greenwood =

James Greenwood may refer to:

- James Greenwood (grammarian) (died 1737), English grammarian
- James Greenwood (journalist) (1832–1929), British social explorer, journalist and writer
- James Greenwood (cricketer) (1806–1870), amateur English cricketer
- James C. Greenwood (born 1951), known as Jim, American politician in the Republican Party
- Jim Greenwood (rugby union) (1929–2010), Scottish international rugby union player
- James Greenwood (rugby league) (born 1991), rugby league footballer
- James Greenwood (Australian politician) (1838–1882), New South Wales politician
