= John Hoadly (playwright) =

English cleric

John Hoadly (1711–1776) was an English cleric, known as a poet and dramatist.

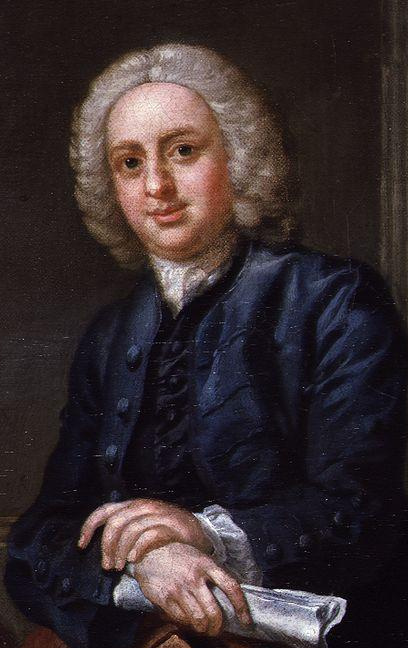
John Hoadly, detail from a picture by Francis Hayman

== Life ==
Born in Broad Street, London, on 8 October 1711, he was the youngest son of Bishop Benjamin Hoadly and his wife the painter Sarah Hoadly. After attending Newcome's school at Hackney, where he played the part of Phocyas in John Hughes's Siege of Damascus,’ he was sent in 1730 to Corpus Christi College, Cambridge. At about the same time he entered the Middle Temple in order to qualify for the bar.

Having graduated LL.B. in 1735 Hoadly decided to become a clergyman, a career in which his father had patronage. On 29 November 1735 he was appointed chancellor of the diocese of Winchester, and was ordained deacon by his father on the following 7 December, and priest the 21st of the same month. He was immediately received into Frederick, Prince of Wales's household as his chaplain, as he afterwards was in that of the Princess Dowager, on 6 May 1751.

Hoadly accumulated preferments. He obtained the rectory of Mitchelmersh, Hampshire, on 8 March 1737, that of Wroughton, Wiltshire, on 8 September, and that of Alresford, Hampshire, and the eighth prebendal stall in Winchester Cathedral on 29 November of the same year. On 9 June 1743 he was instituted to the rectory of St. Mary, near Southampton, and on 16 December 1746 to the vicarage of Overton, Hampshire. On 4 January 1748 Thomas Herring, archbishop of Canterbury, conferred on him the degree of LL.D. In May 1760 he was appointed to the mastership of St. Cross, Winchester. All these preferments he retained until his death (16 March 1776), except the rectory of Wroughton and the prebend of Winchester, which he resigned in June 1760.

== Associates ==
David Garrick was a friend and correspondent of Hoadly's. Hoadly, Garrick and William Hogarth once enacted together Ragandjaw, a parody on the ghost scene in Shakespeare's Julius Cæsar. Hoadly wrote the verses for A Rake's Progress, the printed set of engraving by Hogarth. He was also a friend of Sarah Fielding.

== Works ==
Hoadly assisted his brother Benjamin Hoadly M.D. in writing The Contrast; or, a tragical comical Rehearsal of two modern Plays, and the Tragedy of Epaminondas, which was brought out at the theatre in Lincoln's Inn Fields on 30 April 1731, and performed three times without success. It ridiculed living poets, especially James Thomson. At the desire of their father the bishop it was suppressed. The Contrast was never printed. It is extant in manuscript, in the Bodleian Library, having been rediscovered in 2004.

Other works by Hoadly were:

- Love's Revenge: a dramatic pastoral (anon.), 1734 ([1737] and 1745); set to music by Maurice Greene.
- Jephtha, an oratorio (anon.), 1737; music by Greene.
- Phoebe, a pastoral opera (anon.), 1748; music by Greene.
- The Force of Truth, an oratorio (anon.), 1764.

He wrote the fifth act of James Miller's tragedy Mahomet the Imposter (1744), and completed and revised George Lillo's adaptation of Arden of Feversham (1762). He is said to have assisted his brother Benjamin in the composition of The Suspicious Husband.’ He left several dramas in manuscript: among others The Housekeeper, a Farce, on the plan of James Townley's High Life Below Stairs (in favour of which it was rejected by Garrick); and a tragedy on the life of Thomas Cromwell. Some of his poems are in James Dodsley's Collection; they include a translation of Edward Holdsworth's Muscipula. He also edited his father's works (three volumes, 1773), to which he prefixed a short Life originally in the Biographia Britannica.

== Notes ==
Attribution

This article incorporates text from a publication now in the public domain: Lee, Sidney, ed. (1891). "Hoadly, John (1711-1776)". Dictionary of National Biography. Vol. 27. London: Smith, Elder & Co.
