= Wolferdus Senguerdius =

- Wolfgang Senkward
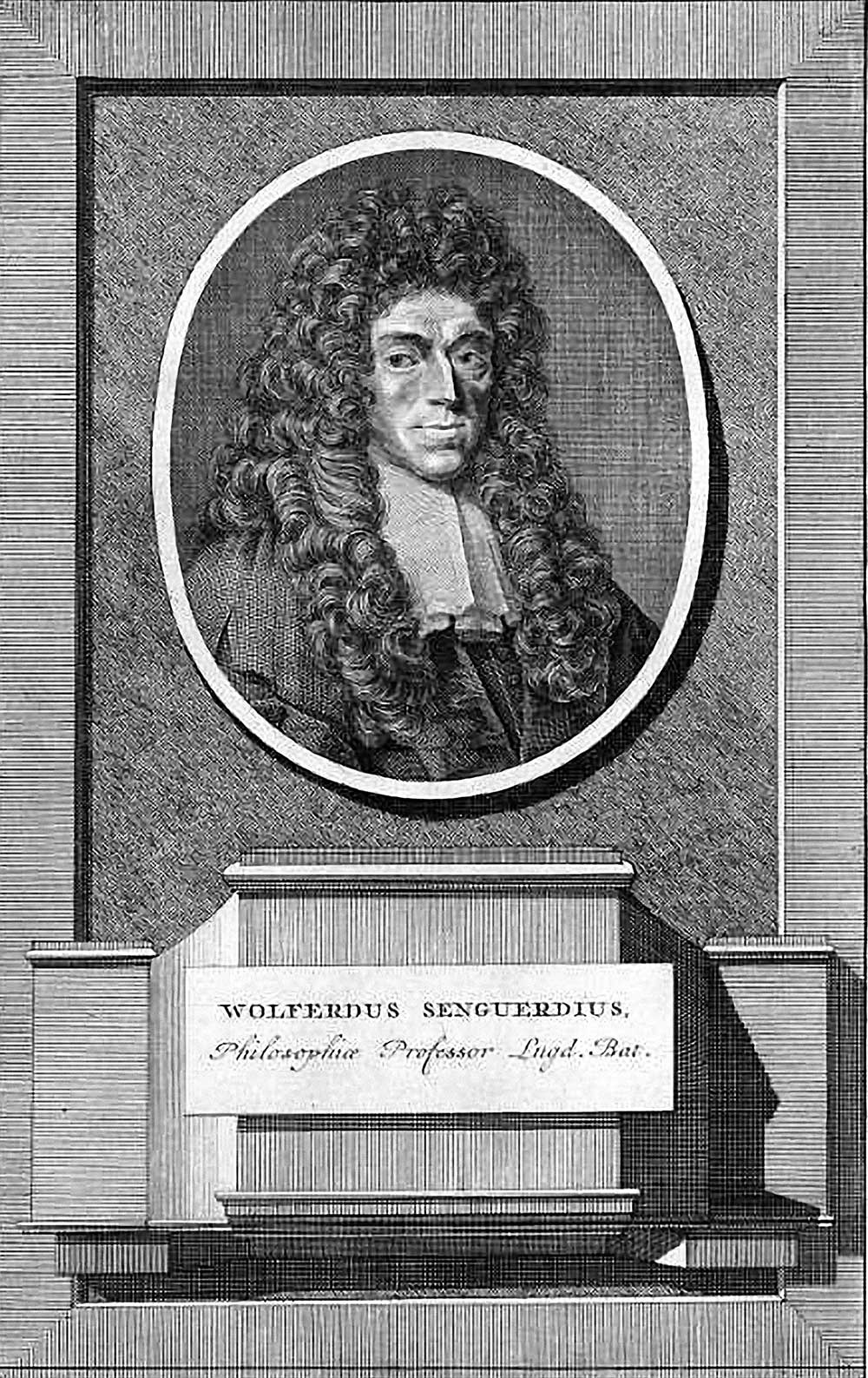
- Wolferdus Senguerdius, Leiden philosophy professor, around 1700. Collectie Bodel Nijenhuis Leiden University.
- Born: 4 July 1646; Utrecht, the Netherlands
- Died: 26 January 1724 (aged 77); Leiden, the Netherlands
- Citizenship: Dutch
- Occupations: professor of natural philosophy/physicist, jurist, university librarian
- Known for: Van Musschenbroek vacuum pump designed by Senguerdius, an improved design for Hooke/Boyle's vacuum pump with one cylinder.
- Parent: Arnoldus Senguerdius

Academic background
- Thesis: Disputatio philosophica inauguralis de tarantula, Leiden 1667

Academic work
- Institutions: Leiden University
- Doctoral students: Herman Boerhaave 1690, Johannes Colonius 1681, John Gale 1699, Pieter van Musschenbroek 1715.
- Notable works: Philosophia naturalis (1685), Inquisitiones Experimentales (1690),Rationis Atque Experientiae Connubium, Continens Experimentorum Physicorum,... Consummatum (1715)
- Notable ideas: Experimentation is essential for progress in natural science

Wolferdus Senguerdius (also Wolfgang Senkward or Wolferd Senguerd, 1664–1724) was a Dutch natural philosopher (physicist), jurist, author and librarian. At Leiden University he taught philosophy as a professor since 1675 and later was also librarian of Leiden University Libraries (1701 - 1724). Although he was appointed professor to defend the philosophy of Aristotle against the rising Cartesianism, he took an eclectic stance promoting the combination of experimentation and rational argument in natural science. He improved the design of the vacuum pump resulting in the Van Musschenbroek vacuum pump and with Burchardus de Volder pioneered public demonstrations of experimental physics.

== Biography ==
Born the only son of Arnoldus Senguerdius, a theology and philosophy professor at Utrecht and later at Amsterdam, Wolferdus Senguerdius studied law and philosophy at Leiden University starting in 1667.

He obtained a PhD doctorate thrice: firstly in 1666 at the Athenaeum Illustre of Amsterdam with the thesis Compendium physicae and as advisor his father Arnold Senguerdius, secondly in 1667 at Leiden University with Disputatio philosophica inauguralis de tarantula on tarantism related to the wolf spider Lycosa tarantula, with an unknown advisor. His third doctorate was in law at the University of Harderwijk in 1681. In 1669 Senguerdius obtained the right to teach and hold disputations at Leiden University. There he was appointed professor of natural philosophy in 1675.

Later, Senguerdius was rector magnificus of Leiden University in the years 1685–1686, 1691–1692, 1701–1702, and 1715–1716. In 1701 Senguerdius was appointed university librarian as the successor of Friedrich Spanheim the Younger, and remained in function up to his decease in 1724.

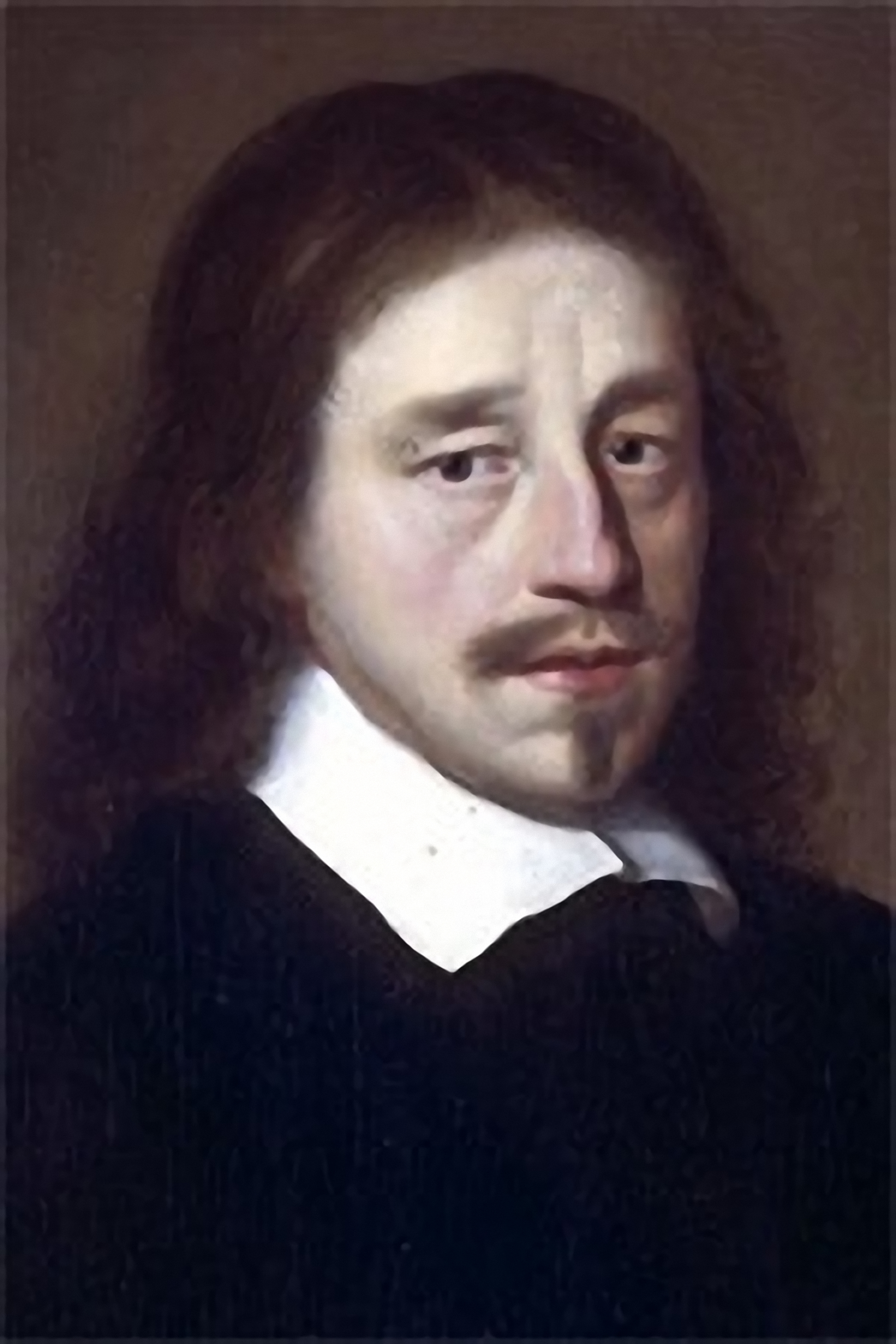
Arnoldus Senguerdius (Amsterdam, 1610 - Naarden, 12 March 1667), father and Amsterdam PhD advisor of Wolferdus Senguerdius. Around 1660.

== Science and education ==
Senguerdius rejected Copernicus' heliocentrism, instead opting for the solar system according to Tycho Brahe (Tychonic system) with still a stationary earth at the centre. The absence of a measurable stellar parallax was a crucial argument to reject a moving earth. Like Newton, Senguerdius also rejected the Cartesian solar vortex pushing the planets, because it was contradicted by the actual behavior of swirling liquids. However, Senguerdius preserved the immobility of the earth in a Cartesian celestial fluid.

He agreed with the atomists and Descartes that natural phenomena are caused by particles in motion, including gravity up to the Moon. But superlunary gravity was deemed impossible to investigate. He also denied the infinity of the universe and rejected the relativity of motion, but affirmed the existence of empty space. According to him, weight of air could not explain the effect of Otto von Guericke's Magdeburg hemispheres. Senguerdius was a staunch promotor of experimental natural science: according to him human reason by itself cannot understand nature, input from the senses is crucial. An experiment can imitate nature, also living bodies such as the breathing lung.

Although Senguerdius kept objecting to the Copernican system, he nevertheless as the librarian installed a Sphaera automatica in the university library in 1711. This was a heliocentric planetarium built in 1672 by Steven Tracey in Rotterdam, and Senguerdius encouraged its use in demonstrations. The planetarium was publicised in a special pamphlet, included in Senguerdius' 1716 university library catalogue, to promote Leiden University.

=== Improvement of the air pump ===
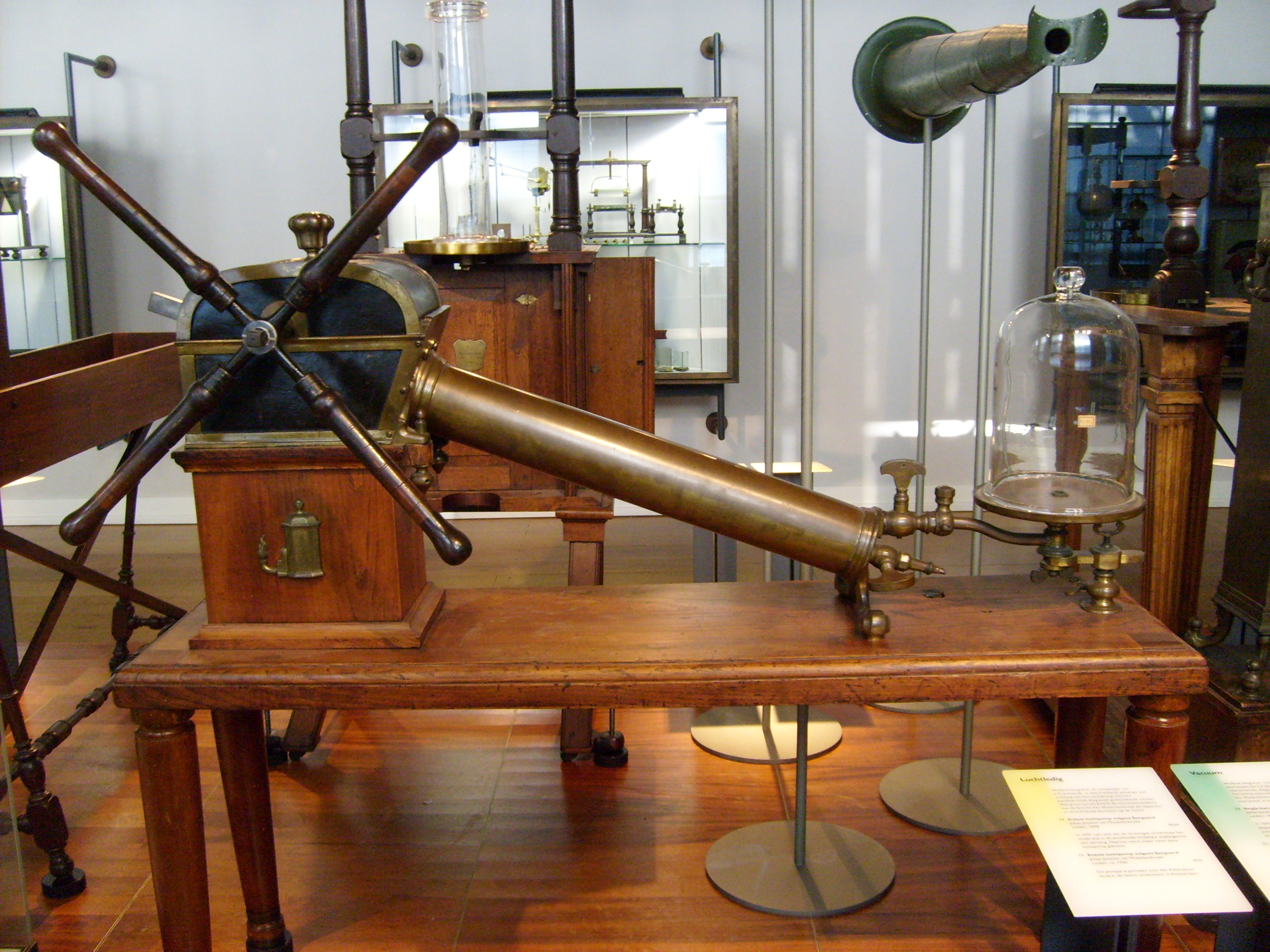
Van Musschenbroek 1698 vacuum pump, designed by Wolferdus Senguerdius.

Senguerdius' efficient new design of the air pump caused this instrument to become widespread in Europe with production ongoing into the 1770s. Senguerd improved on the air pump designs of Von Guericke, Huygens, Hooke/Boyle and Papin, resulting in a simple single barrel pump, which was initially produced by both Samuel and Johannes Joosten van Musschenbroek at Leiden, and later imitated in Britain, France and Germany. Jacob Leupold started a workshop in Leipzig and described his Senguerd air pump in his book Antlia pneumatica illustrata (1707).

== Students ==
Senguerdius' doctoral students, all at Leiden University, include:

Candidate	Thesis	Year	Number of descendants
Herman Boerhaave	Disputatio medica inauguralis, de utilitate explorandorum in aegris excrementorum ut signorum, with co-advisor Burchard de Volder	1690	53340
Johannes Colonius	Disputatio philosophica inauguralis De fulmine	1681	
John Gale	Inquisitio philosophica inauguralis De lapide solis	1699	
Pieter van Musschenbroek	De aëris praesentia in humoribus animalibus (About the presence of air in animal bodily fluids), with co-advisor Herman Boerhaave	1715	2914

== Quote ==
(Latin) Quum autem multo sit facilius, inventis Aliorum aliquid adjicere, quam primo invenire, Experimenta dum ipse tentarem, haec quandoque occasionem mihi praebuerunt, Experimentis ab Aliis excogitatis nova adjiciendi, nonnulla Rerum Naturalium phaenomena detegendi, & ad suas revocandi causas.
Factum hinc quod ad multorum rogationem Physica Collegia Experimentalia in hac Universitate primus instituerim privatim : in quibus exercitium fuit quotidianum, Experimentorum Physicorum, Mechanicorum, &c. demonstratio, eventuum observatio, eorum ad principio revocatio, usus enarratio, per ratiocinia illustratio, adeoque Rationis atque Experientiae Conjugium consummare.

— Wolferdus Senguerdius, Rationis atque Experientiae Connubium...Consummatum (1715, The Marriage of Reason and Experiment... Comsummated), Ad lectorem auctor (Foreword, p. 5.)
Translation:

(Translation) But because it is much easier to add something to what others invented than to invent it first, when I attempted experiments myself, these sometimes provided me the opportunity to add new things to the experiments thought out by others, to discover some phenomena of natural things, and to explain them by their causes.
It so happened that, at the request of many, I was the first to establish privately the Experimental Physics Colleges in this University: in which the daily exercise was the demonstration of experiments in physics, mechanics, &c., the observation of the results, their reference to the principle, the description of their applications, the illustration by reasonings, and thus to consummate the marriage of reason and experience.

== Publications ==
Senguerdius' publications include:

=== Natural philosophy ===
- Senguerdius, Wolferdus (1685). Philosophia naturalis, quatuor partibus primarias corporum species, affectiones, differentias, productiones, mutationes, et interitus exhibens [Natural Philosophy, in four parts, presenting the primary species of bodies, their properties, distinctions, productions, changes, and destruction.] (in Latin). Daniel van Gaasbeeck. Full text scan at Utrecht University Library.
  - Senguerdius, Wolferdus (1685). Philosophia naturalis, quatuor partibus, primarias corporum species, affectiones, differentias, produc-tiones, mutationes et interitus exhibens (2. ed.). Lugd. Batav.: D. a Gaesbeeck. Full text scan at Bayerische Staatsbibliothek München. 432 pages.
- Senguerdius, Wolferdus (1667). Disputatio philosophica inauguralis de tarantula (in Latin). Leiden (Lugdunum apud Batavos): Heirs J. Elsevirius. OCLC 458796388.
  - Senguerdius, Wolferdus (1668). Tractatus physicus de tarantula. In quo praeter ejus descriptionem effectus veneni Tarantulae, qui hactenus fuerunt occultis qualitatibus adscripti, rationibus naturalibus dedu-cuntur, & illustrantur (in Latin).
- Senguerdius, Wolferdus (1687). Ars argumentandi : in qua argumentationis natura, varii ejus modi, ac leges, nec non sophistarum strophae, ad rectae rationis normam revocantur, ea confirmantur, ac deteguntur (in Latin) (2nd ed.). Leiden: Felix Lopez. OCLC 65236376.
- Senguerdius, Wolferdus (1690). Inquisitiones Experimentales Qvibvs Naturæ operandi ratio in nonullis detegitur, & Mechanicè proponitur, Effectus ex eà resultantes exhibentur, ad Causas revocantur, Experimentis & Ratiociniis illustrantur . [Experimental inquiries, in a few of which by which reason of nature's operation is detected and mechanically proposed, the effects are shown, reduced to the causes, illustrated by experiments and explanations] (in Latin). Leiden (Lugdunum Batavorum): Felix Lopez. OCLC 253672082. 58 pages.
- Senguerdius, Wolferdus (1715). Rationis Atque Experientiae Connubium, Continens Experimentorum Physicorum,... Consummatum [The marriage of reason and experiments, containing ..., consumed]. Rotterdam: Bernardus Bos. OCLC 488980468. Rationis Atque Experientiae Connubium at Google Books 328 pages. Includes Disquisitio de tarantula. Also "Wolferd Senguerdius (1646-1724)". prdl.org. Post-Reformation Digital Library. Junius Institute for Digital Reformation Research. 2014.

=== Library science ===
- Senguerdius, Wolferdus; Gronovius, Jacobus (1716). Catalogus librorum tam impressorum quam manuscriptorum bibliothecæ publicæ Universitatis Lugduno-Batavæ (in Latin). Leiden (Lugdunum apud Batavos): Petrus Vander Aa. OCLC 38691182. Planetarium "Sphaera automatica" on p. 499, scan.

== Secondary literature ==
- Berkvens-Stevelinck, Christiane (2012). Magna commoditas : Leiden University's great asset : 425 years library collections and services. Translated by UvA Talen, Amsterdam. Leiden: Leiden University Press. pp. 114–117, 121 (portrait p. 114). ISBN 9789087281656. OCLC 794706996.
- Crommelin, C.A. (1925). Instrumentmakerskunst en proefondervindelijke natuurkunde [The Art of Instrument Making and Experimental Physics] (in Dutch). Leiden: IJdo. OCLC 14558589.
- de Clercq, Peter (1991). "Exporting scientific instruments around 1700. The Musschenbroek Documents in Marburg" (PDF). Tractrix. 3: 79–120. PMID 11612624.. On page 82.
- de Hinojosa, Adriaen Pieter (1690). Dictata in Renati Des-Cartes Principia Anno 1690.. Unpublished notes of Senguerdius' lectures by a student. Manuscript at Koninklijke Bibliotheek, The Hague. 105 pages.
- de Pater, C. (1975). "Experimental physics". In Posthumus Meyjes and, G. H. M.; Lunsingh Scheurleer, H. (eds.). Leiden University in the seventeenth century. An exchange of learning. pp. 309–328. doi:10.1163/9789004619142_013. ISBN 978-90-04-61914-2.
- Ducheyne, Steffen (2025). "5 Herman Boerhaave, the Introduction of Newton's Natural Philosophy at the University of Leiden, and the Unshackling 'the Bondage of Sectarianism'". Physics in Minerva's Academy. Scientific and learned cultures and their institutions. Vol. 37. Leiden: Brill. pp. 143–228. doi:10.1163/9789004716162_006. ISBN 9789004716155. OCLC 1472773150. 460 pages.
- Knoeff, Rina (2002). Herman Boerhaave (1668-1738). Calvinist chemist and physician (PDF). Amsterdam: Koninklijke Akademie van Wetenschappen. ISBN 9789069843421. OCLC 50993876. Pages 23–24, 28, 47, 119, 134, 162, 165.
- Ruestow, Edward Grant (1973). Physics at seventeenth and eighteenth-century Leiden: philosophy and the new Science in the University. Archives internationales d'histoire des idées. Vol. 11. Den Haag: Nijhoff. ISBN 9024715571. OCLC 905449654.
- Siegenbeek, Matthijs (1829–1832). Geschiedenis der Leidsche hoogeschool : van hare oprigting in den jare 1575, tot het jaar 1825 (in Dutch). Vol. 2. Leiden: Luchtmans. p. 151. OCLC 780621372.
- Zedler, Johann Heinrich. Grosses vollständiges Universal-Lexicon aller Wissenschafften und Künste. Vol. 37. p. 42.

== See also ==
- Van Musschenbroek vacuum pump
