= Henry Taylor (priest) =

Henry Taylor (1711–1785) was a Church of England priest and religious controversialist.

== Life ==
He was born at South Weald, the son of the London merchant William Taylor (1673–1750) and his wife, Anne Crisp. He was educated at Newcome's School in Hackney, and then at Queens' College, Cambridge.

Taylor's clerical career was advanced by the support of Benjamin Hoadly, from 1734 Bishop of Winchester. He was Rector of Wheatfield, Oxfordshire from 1737 to 1746, Vicar of Portsmouth from 1745 and Rector of Crawley from 1755.

== Works ==
Taylor was an Arian who used various pseudonyms in religious controversies with William Warburton, Soame Jenyns and Edward Gibbon. His works included:

- The apology of Benjamin Ben Mordecai to his friends, for embracing Christianity; in seven letters to Elisha Levi ... together with an eighth letter, on the generation of Jesus Christ. The letters appeared from 1771 to 1777, and were republished together in 1784. This work concerned his adherence to the Apollinarian heresy.
- Confusion Worse Confounded, 1772. Against William Warburton, as "Indignatio".
- A Full Answer to a ... Late View of the Internal Evidence of Christian Religion, 1777, anonymous. Against Soame Jenyns.
- An Enquiry into the Opinions of the Learned Christians, 1777. As "Khalid E'bn Abdallah".
- Thoughts on the nature of the grand apostacy; with reflections on the 15th chapter of Mr Gibbon's History, 1781
- Farther Thoughts on the Nature of the Grand Apostacy of the Christian Churches (1783).
