= Sarah Hoadly =

British artist (1676–1743)

- Born: Sarah Curtis; 1676
- Died: 1743 (aged 66–67)
- Known for: Painting
- Spouse: Benjamin Hoadly (m. 1701)

Sarah Curtis (1676–1743), was a British portrait painter. She was married to Benjamin Hoadly.

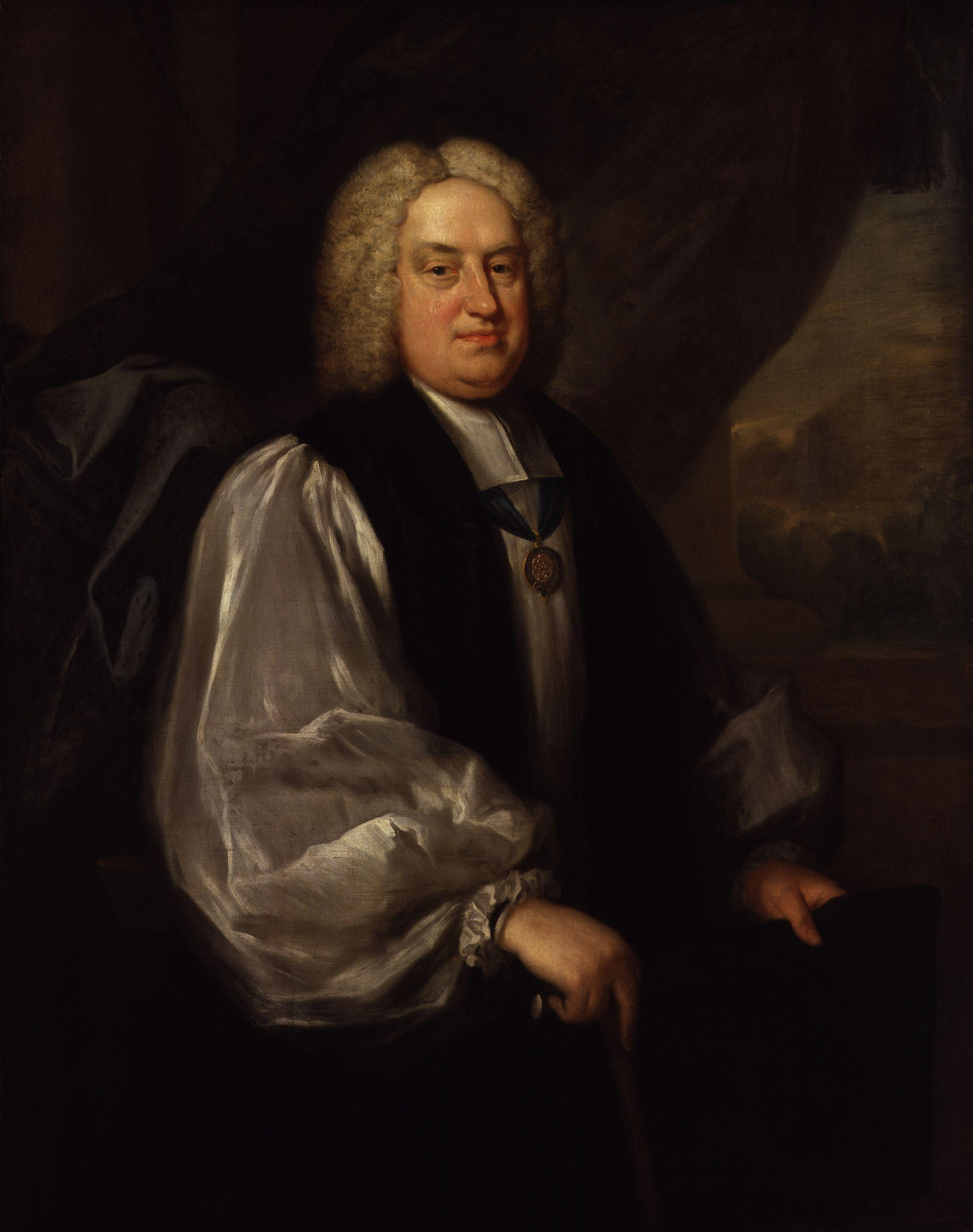
Portrait of Benjamin Hoadly (1676–1761) by Sarah Hoadly, National Portrait Gallery, London, circa 1726–1743

== Life ==
Sarah Curtis was born in 1676 and before her marriage she gained a reputation as a portrait painter. She was a pupil of Mary Beale, and among her sitters were William Whiston, Gilbert Burnet, and her husband. Her portrait of Burnet was engraved by William Faithorne the Younger. The picture of her husband, which was, "as is believed, touched up by Hogarth", is in the National Portrait Gallery.

Curtis married one of her sitters, Benjamin Hoadly, her second husband, at St. James's, Piccadilly, on 30 May 1701. By her the bishop had five children, all sons, two still-born, and Samuel, Benjamin, and John, afterwards the editor of his works. She died in 1743. The bishop's second marriage (23 July 1745) was with Mary, daughter and coheiress of Dr. John Newey, dean of Chichester.

== Legacy ==
Hoadly has several paintings in National collections in the United Kingdom, besides the one in the National Portrait Gallery.
