= Newcome's School =

English boys' school

Coordinates: 51°33′13″N 00°03′04″W

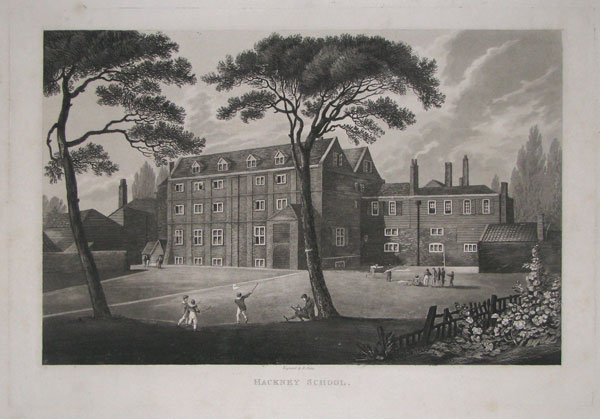
Engraving c. 1820 of the former Newcome's School in Hackney

Newcome's School was a boys' school in Hackney, then to the east of London, founded in the early 18th century. A number of prominent Whig families sent their sons there. The school closed in 1815, and the buildings were gutted in 1820. In 1825 the London Orphan Asylum opened on the site. Today the Clapton Girls' Academy is located here.

== History ==
Newcome's school was established in the early 18th century. During the 18th century and early 19th century, Hackney was home to schools of all kinds, including a number of significant dissenting academies. It was considered a healthy area, close to London and with easy access in all weathers via the Old North Road.

Many prominent Whig families sent their sons to the school, resulting in a large number of Members of Parliament having received their education there. Dr. Henry Newcome, who gave the school its name, was noted for Whig political principles, and the school stayed in the family for three generations, to 1803. The family descended from Henry Newcome, a prominent nonconformist minister in Manchester. His third son Peter was an Anglican priest, and the father of the Henry Newcome who gave the school its name.

Distinguished pupils included Augustus FitzRoy, 3rd Duke of Grafton, Prime Minister from 1768 to 1770, and two Founding Fathers of the United States (Middleton and Nelson).

The school closed in 1815, and the building was knocked down in 1820. In 1825 the London Orphan Asylum opened on the site. The History of Parliament (1820–1832) comments that, even after its closure, the school could count nine Members of Parliament educated there in the period. It sent 42 pupils to Trinity College, Cambridge.

Today the Clapton Girls' Academy is located on the site.

== Drama ==
Newcome's School was noted for a series of dramatic productions. In some case a prologue or epilogue was written specially. The school was one of a group that acted as preparatory schools to Westminster School; the dramatic tradition imitated Westminster's, with the difference that plays were in English (rather than Latin). One of the contributors of prologues was David Garrick. The custom of giving a play every three years was also taken over from the Elizabethan statutes of Westminster School. It ended about 1800.

- 1720s A prologue and epilogue to Tamerlane by Nicholas Rowe were written by Richard Steele, it is thought for use by the school.
- The Siege of Damascus by John Hughes, with John Hoadly and Charles Plumptre
- 1748 Henry IV Part I, epilogue written by John Hoadly.
- About 1761. Andria by Terence, prologue by Garrick.
- 1764 Siege of Damascus (revival), prologue by John Hoadly
- 1777, Henry IV Part I, epilogue by George Keate.
- 1783 King Lear
- 1802 Julius Caesar, epilogue written.

Other plays known to have been given by the performance of Andria were Shakespeare's King John and Macbeth.

== Staff ==
James Greenwood was usher (assistant head teacher) under Benjamin Morland, then leaving to set up his own academy. George Budd taught art there. William Coleridge, elder brother of Samuel Taylor Coleridge, taught at the school in the 1780s.

=== Head Masters ===
- Benjamin Morland, F.R.S., who became High Master of St Paul's School, London in 1721.
- Henry Newcome, LL.D. (baptised 1689, died 1756). He was educated at St Paul's School and Emmanuel College, Cambridge. Newcome's doctoral degree is not placed by Venn, but he certainly used it and was known as "Dr. Newcome". He married Morland's daughter Lydia in 1714, and took over the school. His second wife was Anne Yalden.
- 1756 Peter Newcome, son of Henry Newcome.
- Henry Newcome, half-brother of Peter.
- Richard Newcome, son of Henry, to 1803.
- Charles Thomas Heathcote, head from 1805. He had been a Fellow of Trinity College, Cambridge and assistant master of Charterhouse School; he was vicar of Rodmersham and then Little Wigborough. In his time it was known as Hackney School.

== Pupils ==
- George Augustus Addison
- Charles Bosanquet
- Charles John Brandling
- Montagu Burgoyne
- Stratford Canning.
- Henry Cavendish
- Lord John Cavendish
- Richard Muilman Trench Chiswell
- William Clubbe
- Sir William Congreve, 2nd Baronet
- Thomas Creevey
- William Dade
- Charles Feake
- Sir George Ralph Fetherston, 3rd Baronet of Ardagh
- Augustus Henry FitzRoy, 3rd Duke of Grafton and Lord Charles FitzRoy
- Sir Gilbert Heathcote, 4th Baronet
- Frederick Hervey, 4th Earl of Bristol
- Benjamin Hoadly
- John Hoadly
- Sir Claudius Hunter, 1st Baronet
- James Jurin the younger
- James Winter Lake
- Aylmer Bourke Lambert; the curriculum in his time has been described as "undemanding".
- Crisp Molineux
- Ralph Leycester
- John Luther
- Peter Newcome
- Henry Handley Norris
- John Ord
- Sir Hugh Owen, 5th Baronet
- John Pardoe
- Peter Payne
- Richard Pennant, 1st Baron Penrhyn
- Louis Hayes Petit.
- James Plumptre
- Robert Plumptre
- John Rushout, 2nd Baron Northwick
- Sir Lumley Skeffington, 2nd Baronet
- Hans Sloane
- Oliver St John
- Matthew St Quintin
- Sir William St Quintin, 4th Baronet
- Henry Taylor
- Benjamin Vaughan
- William Vaughan
- Charles Western, 1st Baron Western
- Edward Charles Whinyates
- The brothers Charles Yorke, Joseph Yorke, 1st Baron Dover, Philip Yorke, 2nd Earl of Hardwicke, James Yorke, and John Yorke. Their father Philip Yorke, 1st Earl of Hardwicke had been a pupil of Samuel Morland, a dissenting tutor, in Bethnal Green. Samuel Morland, Benjamin Morland who founded the school and Joseph Morland the physician were brothers.
- Philip Yorke the antiquarian

=== American pupils ===
- Ralph Izard
- Arthur Middleton
- Thomas Nelson, Jr.
- Jonathan Sewell
