= Edward Charles Whinyates =

British general (1782–1865)

General Sir Edward Charles Whinyates KCB KH
- Born: 6 May 1782 near Calcutta, British India
- Died: 25 December 1865 (aged 83); Cheltenham, Gloucestershire, England
- Burial place: St Mary's Churchyard; Prestbury, Gloucestershire, England
- Military career
- Allegiance: United Kingdom
- Branch: British Army
- Service years: 1798–1865
- Rank: General
- Unit: Royal Artillery
- Commands: H Troop, Royal Horse Artillery
- Conflicts: War of the Second Coalition; Anglo-Russian invasion of Holland; Napoleonic Wars; Battle of Copenhagen; Battle of Waterloo; Peninsular War; Anglo-Russian invasion of Holland
- Awards: Knight Commander of the Order of the Bath; Knight of the Royal Guelphic Order

General Sir Edward Charles Whinyates KCB KH (6 May 1782 – 25 December 1865) was a senior British Army artillery officer.

== Biography ==
Whinyates was the son of Major Thomas Whinyates of Abbotsleigh, Devon, and his wife Katharine Frankland, and was educated at Newcombe's School in Hackney. In 1796 he entered the Royal Military Academy, Woolwich as a cadet and was commissioned as second lieutenant in the Royal Artillery on 1 March 1798.

He became lieutenant in 1799 and accompanied the expedition in that year to Den Helder in the Netherlands and the expedition to Madeira in 1801. When Madeira was evacuated at the Peace of Amiens, he went with his company to Jamaica and was made adjutant. In 1805 he was promoted second captain and came home. He served as adjutant to the artillery in the attack on Copenhagen in 1807 and the following year was posted to D troop of the Royal Horse Artillery.

In February 1810 he embarked with his unit for the Peninsula, but their transport ship Camilla nearly sank and had to put back. Owing to this, D troop did not take the field as a unit until 1811. However, Whinyates was present at Busaco in 1810, acting as adjutant to the officer commanding the artillery. He was also at the Battle of Albuera on 16 May 1811 with four guns, the cavalry affair at Usagre on 25 May, and in the actions at Fuentes de Guinaldo and Aldea de Ponte on 25 and 27 Sep

In 1812 D troop was with Rowland Hill's corps on the Tagus river. At Ribera, Whinyates made such good use of two guns that the French commander Lallemand inquired his name, and sent him a message: ‘Tell that brave man that if it had not been for him, I should have beaten your cavalry’. When the captain of D troop died at Madrid in October Whinyates took over the command for the next four months, during which time the troop distinguished itself at San Muñoz on 17 November, at the close of the retreat from Burgos, five out of its six guns being injured. General Long, who commanded the cavalry to which it was attached, afterwards wrote of the troop that he had never witnessed 'more exemplary conduct in quarters, nor more distinguished zeal and gallantry in the field.’

In 1813 Whinyates was made captain, and consequently left the Peninsula in March. In 1814 he was appointed to the second rocket troop, and he commanded it at Waterloo. Wellington, who did not believe in rockets, ordered that they should be left behind. When he was told that this would break Whinyates's heart, he replied: ‘Damn his heart; let my orders be obeyed.’ However, Whinyates eventually obtained leave to bring them into the field, together with his six guns. When Ponsonby's brigade charged D'Erlon's corps, he followed it with his rocket sections, and fired several volleys of ground-rockets with good effect against the French cavalry. He then rejoined his guns, which were placed in front of Picton's division. In the course of the day he had three horses shot under him, was struck on the leg, and severely wounded in the left arm. He received a brevet majority and the Waterloo medal, and afterwards the Peninsular silver medal with clasps for Busaco and Albuera.

At the end of 1815, the rocket troop were sent to England to be reduced, and Whinyates remained behind until 1818, appointed to a troop of drivers in the army of occupation. He commanded H troop of horse artillery from 1823 to 22 July 1830, when he became regimental lieutenant-colonel and was made KH in 1823 and CB in 1831. He had command of the horse artillery at Woolwich from November 1834 to May 1840, and of the artillery in the northern district for eleven years afterwards, having become regimental colonel on 23 November 1841.

On 1 April 1852 he was appointed director-general of artillery, and on 19 August commandant at Woolwich, where he remained till 1 June 1856. He had been promoted major-general on 20 June 1854, and became lieutenant-general on 7 June 1856, and general on 10 December 1864. He was elevated to KCB on 18 May 1860. He had become colonel-commandant of a battalion on 1 April 1855, and was transferred to the horse artillery on 22 July 1864.

He died at Cheltenham on 25 December 1865. In 1827 he had married Elizabeth, only daughter of Samuel Compton of Wood End, North Riding, Yorkshire but left no children. He did have five brothers, of whom four served with distinction in the army and navy.

== See also ==
- List of British Army full generals
