= George Augustus Addison =

British public official and writer

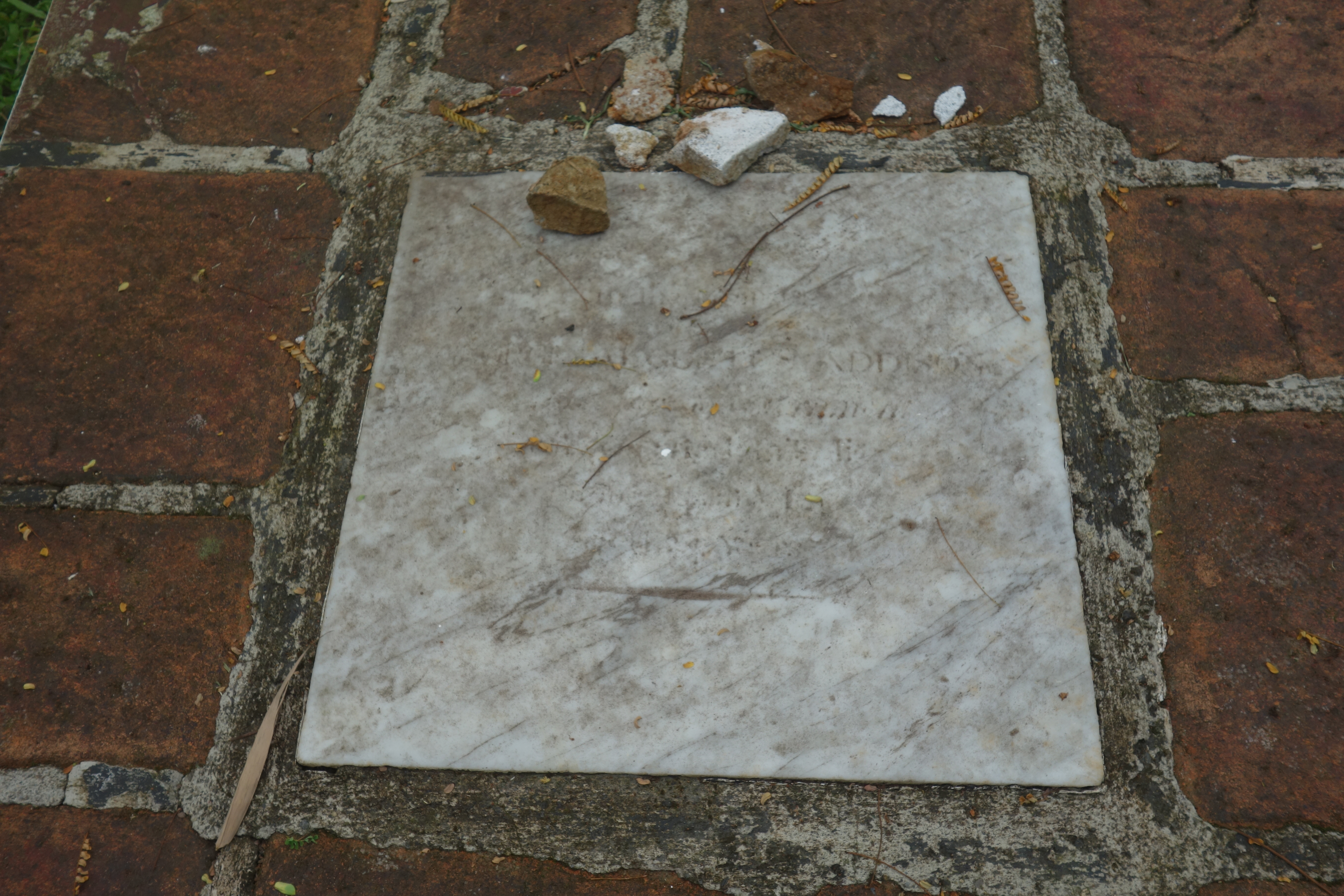
Grave of George Addison, Bogor Botanical Gardens

George Augustus Addison (1792—14 January 1815) was a British public official and writer.

== Early life ==
Addison was born in Calcutta in 1792, the son of John Addison, a civil servant in the East India Company who was at that time Judge of Natore. He was sent home at the age of five to be educated at Newcome's School in Hackney before returning to the Far East.

== Career and death ==
Like his father, Addison became a public servant and by 1814 was Private Secretary to Sir Stamford Raffles. Whilst serving in Java, he succumbed to a fever and died on 14 January 1815 (aged 22–23).

== Posthumous publication of memoir ==
His memoir and collected works were published posthumously under the title, Indian Reminiscences, or the Bengal Moofussul Miscellany, in London by Edward Bull in 1837. His knowledge of languages, his mathematical and classical attainments, his excellent qualities, and his religious character, are all highly extolled in the introduction to that work.
