= Elizabeth Vincent =

British stage actress (c.1708–??)

Elizabeth Vincent (born c.1708) was a British stage actress of the eighteenth century. She was the wife of the instrumentalist and composer, Richard Vincent.

== Biography ==
Born as Elizabeth Bincks she was likely the daughter of Mrs Bincks, later the Dresser at Covent Garden Theatre. Elizabeth's first known performance was at the Lincoln's Inn Fields Theatre in 1729. She became an established part of John Rich's company at Covent Garden company from 1732 onwards. During these years she was credited as Miss Bincks on playbills, before her marriage to Richard Vincent in 1737 after which she was known as Mrs Vincent.

In the period 1739–42 Elizabeth was associated with a para-masonic group of male and female theatre folk calling itself the Modern Masons that met at Silvester's Gardens in Clerkenwell. This was one of several groups unsympathetic to the Ministry of Prime Minister Robert Walpole that made works in support of the anti-Walpole Patriot Opposition, a.k.a. the Patriot Party.

She continued to act at Covent Garden, generally playing young ladies in comedies, until 1748. During the summers she also appeared at Bartholomew Fair and Richmond Theatre. She accepted an invitation from Thomas Sheridan to appear at the Smock Alley Theatre in Dublin and acted there for a season before returning to Covent Garden the following year. She was a principal actress at Smock Alley before moving to Drury Lane in 1761 to perform in The Beggar's Opera. She acted continuously at Covent Garden for the next twenty three years until she was discharged by the management in 1773. Fellow actress Kitty Clive felt this was unfair after her long service. The poet and satirist Charles Churchill complimented her in his work, Rosciad.

The exact year of her death is unknown, but her husband died in 1783. Three of their children had performing career with one of their sons becoming a musician and another an actor. These included the musician, Richard Vincent the younger, who was married to Isabella, another actress at Drury Lane. Her daughter joined the Covent Garden company in 1762 and acted for several years as 'Miss Vincent'.

== Selected roles ==
- Ophelia in Hamlet (1732)
- Penelope in Tunbridge Walks (1733)
- Lucy in The Beggar's Opera (1733)
- Lesbia in Achilles (1733)
- Duke of Malfy in The Fatal Secret (1733)
- Isabella in The Squire of Alsatia (1734)
- Sylvia in The Recruiting Officer (1734)
- Selima in Tamerlane (1734)
- Country Wife in The Country Wife (1734)
- Fanny in The Double Deceit (1735)
- Cordelia in A Fond Husband (1735)
- Jessica in The Jew Of Venice (1735)
- Phoebe in Three Hours After Marriage (1737)
- Jacintha in The Suspicious Husband (1747)
- Rosalind in As You Like It (1748)
- Anna in Douglas (1757)

== Bibliography ==
- Highfill, Philip H, Burnim, Kalman A. & Langhans, Edward A. A Biographical Dictionary of Actors, Actresses, Musicians, Dancers, Managers, and Other Stage Personnel in London, 1660–1800: West to Zwingman. SIU Press, 1978.
- The Patriot Opposition to Walpole: Politics, Poetry, and National Myth, 1725-1742 by Christine Gerrard (Oxford: Oxford University Press, 1993).
