= Francis Hauksbee the Younger =

English instrument maker and experimentalist

Francis Hauksbee the Younger (1687 – 11 January 1763) was an English instrument maker and experimentalist.

== Life ==
He was son of John Hauksbee, who belonged to the Drapers' Company, and his wife Mary; and a nephew of Francis Hauksbee the elder. He was elected clerk and housekeeper to the Royal Society on 9 May 1723. Augustus De Morgan believed that Hauksbee was the first to give lectures with experiments in London, and began them about 1714. He collaborated with William Whiston on lecture series.

Hauksbee died on 11 January 1763, aged 75.

== Instrument maker ==
According to an advertisement, Hauksbee made and sold air-pumps, hydrostatic balances, and reflecting telescopes in Crane Court, Fleet Street, London. His Proposals for making a large Reflecting Telescope evidences skill as an instrument-maker, and also an acquaintance with John Hadley.

== Works ==
In 1731 was published Essay for introducing a Portable Laboratory by means whereof all the Chemical operations are commodiously performed by P. Shaw and F. Hauksbee, dedicated to Sir Hans Sloane. In 1731 also, Hauksbee printed Experiments with a view to Practical Philosophy, Arts, Trades, and Business, a summary of conventional chemical operations, with illustrations of distillation, mineralogy, metallurgy, and dyeing. This publication was a syllabus of a course of experimental lectures, Experimental Course of Astronomy proposed by Mr. Whiston and Mr. Hauksbee. Course of Mechanical, Optical, and Pneumatical Experiments, to be performed by Francis Hauksbee, and the Explanatory Lectures read by Wm. Whiston, M.A. covered "Pneumatics". Its scope included, with experiments on the "qualities of air", others "concerning the vitreous phosphori", and "relating to the electricity of bodies".

== Notes ==
Attribution

- This article incorporates text from a publication now in the public domain: Stephen, Leslie; Lee, Sidney, eds. (1891). "Hauksbee, Francis". Dictionary of National Biography. Vol. 25. London: Smith, Elder & Co.
