= Peter Newcome =

Peter Newcome (1715–1779) was an English educator and Fellow of the Royal Society.

== Life ==
He was the son of Henry Newcome LL.D. of Hackney (died 1756) and Lydia Morland. His father established Newcome's School there, a noted private academy. Richard Newcome was his uncle. His paternal grandfather was Peter Newcome, son of Henry Newcome the nonconformist minister, and his maternal grandfather was Benjamin Morland; the school was previously run by Morland. Peter Newcome the son matriculated at Queens' College, Cambridge, in 1732, graduating B.A. in 1735 and M.A. in 1738. He was then a fellow of the college from 1740 to 1742.

The Newcome family had a social connection to the family of Henry Grey, 1st Duke of Kent, who died in 1740. Lord Charles Cavendish married the Duke's daughter Anne Grey, and Henry Cavendish, the natural philosopher, was their son, and a pupil at Newcome's School from 1742. His father recommended Peter Newcome for the Royal Society in the same year. The other sponsors were Philip Yorke who was an alumnus of Newcome's School, Thomas Birch and Daniel Wray.

Through this connection to the Cavendish circle, Newcome participated in scientific life in London. He joined the informal Royal Society dining club in 1744. He attended Sir William Watson's 1747 experiments in the conduction of electricity across the River Thames. Later, in the 1760s, Newcome was on the Royal Society's council. He published in the Philosophical Transactions a paper on an earthquake of 1750.

Newcome took over the school on his father's death. He inherited local property rights, in Clapton, on condition that he continued as the school head; he did so, but for three years only. Newcome's School was fashionable, and was noted for its drama; David Garrick contributed to one in 1763. Eventually Newcome ceded control to his half-brother Henry, who was succeeded by his son Richard.
