= A New Theory of the Earth =

Book by William Whiston

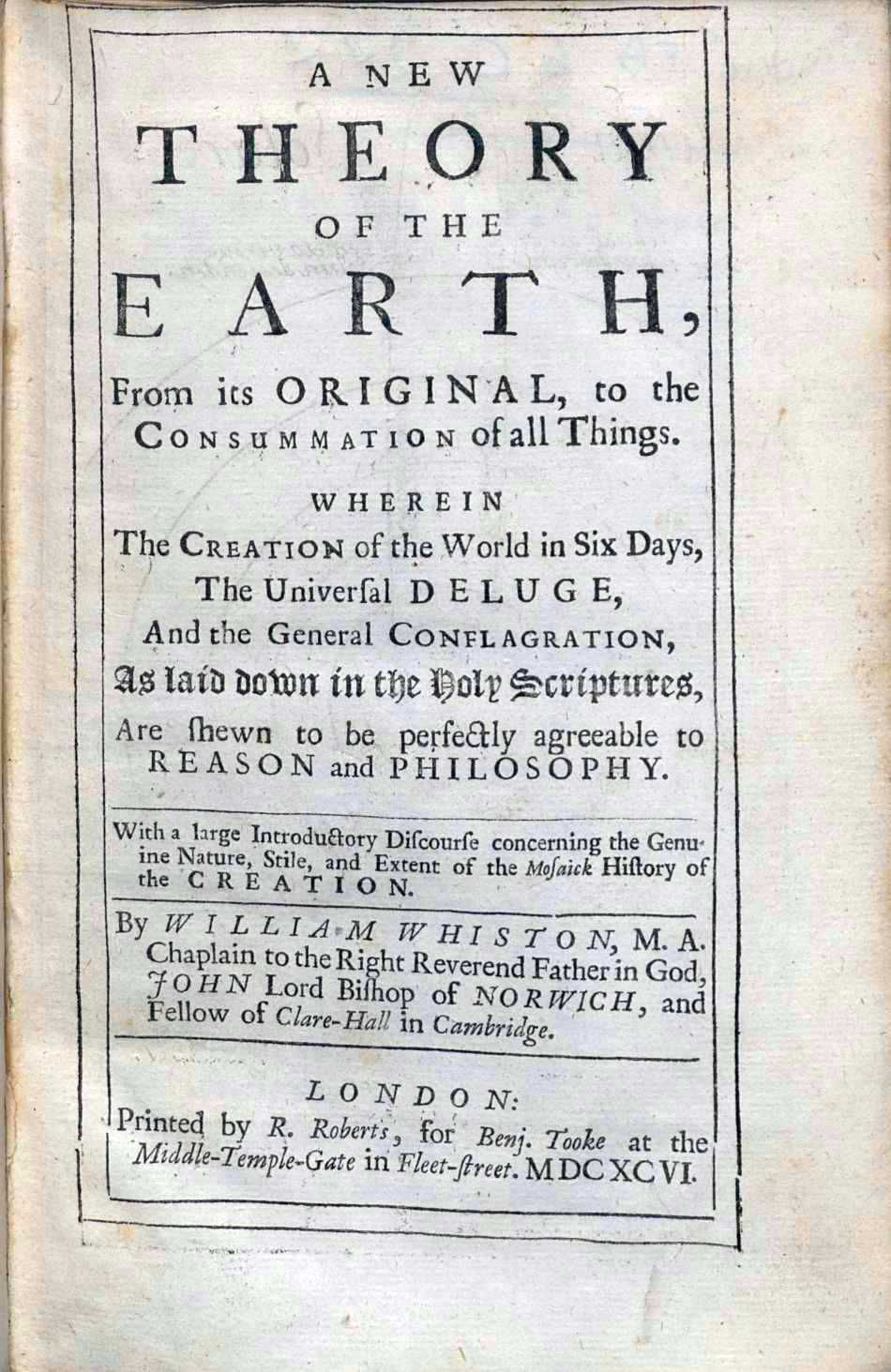
Title page for A New theory of the Earth, 1696

A New Theory of the Earth is a book written by William Whiston, in which he presents a description of the divine creation of the Earth and a posited global flood. He also postulates that the earth originated from the atmosphere of a comet and that all major changes in earth's history can be attributed to the action of comets – a position now known as "catastrophism." It was published in 1696 and was well received by intellectuals of the day such as Isaac Newton and John Locke.

== Summary of the book ==
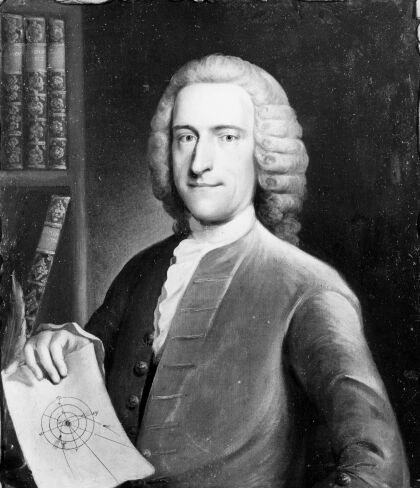
A portrait of Whiston with a diagram demonstrating his theories of cometary catastrophism described in A New Theory of the Earth

The book is organized as follows:

- Introduction, discussing the text of Creation according to Genesis
- Book I: Lemmata, discussing the premises and assumptions on which his argument is based;
- Book II: Hypotheses, discussing his model for the origin of the Earth;
- Book III: Phaenomena, discussing evidence predicted by his model;
- Book IV: Solutions, discussing how his model explains the evidence;
- Appendix: An abstract of his theory drawn from various sources.

=== Introduction ===
In the introduction, Whiston discusses the Mosaic account of creation. He argues for a literal interpretation of Genesis, writing:

"We must never forsake the plain, obvious, easy and natural sense, unless where the nature of the thing itself, parallel places, or evident reason, afford a solid and sufficient reason for so doing."

In so doing, he challenges allegorical and mythological interpretations of Genesis, concluding that:

"The Mosaic Creation is not a nice and philosophical account of the origin of all things; but a historical and true representation of the formation of our single Earth out of a confused Chaos, and of the successive and visible changes thereof each Day, till it became the habitation of mankind." (p.3)

He interprets the Genesis account of creation as being only of the preparation of the Earth for mankind, and not as an account of creation from nothing. He draws this from the text, as the account speaks of the waters that existed before God's first creative act on the first day, implying that the Earth predates Genesis chapter one.

He interprets the account of "placing the heavenly bodies in the firmament" as simply being a consequence of the terrestrial frame of reference, for the heavenly bodies do in fact revolve about the Earth from the perspective of a man standing on the Earth.

He describes his Arianism, or the view that Jesus is subordinate to God but first in creation, a view considered heretical within much of Christianity. He also asserts that it is very reasonable to believe that man may well be simply one of many intelligent beings, and certainly not the highest before God. He wrote that humanity was fallen, and currently in a miserable state akin to probation.

He concludes the introduction with his three Postulata:

1. "The obvious or literal sense of scripture is the true and real one, where no evidence reason can be given to the contrary.
2. That which is clearly accountable in a natural way, is not, without reason to be ascribed to a miraculous power.
3. What ancient tradition asserts of the constitution of nature, or of the origin and primitive states of the world, is to be allowed for true, where ’tis fully agreeable to scripture, reason, and philosophy."

=== Book I: Lemmata ===
Whiston begins by arguing for the existence of a human soul. He argues that the Newtonian laws of motion provide that matter may never move spontaneously, but only when acted upon by an outside force. He notes that humans, animals, and plants are able to move spontaneously, and concludes that they must be more than "mere matter," which, especially in the case of humans, he argues to be evidence of an incorporeal soul.

=== Books II, III, and IV: Phenomena ===
In the next sections of his book, Whiston goes on to describe his theory of the creation of the Earth, and the flood. He asserted that the Earth was originally a comet, which God formed from its initial "chaos and void" into a habitable planet. He also argued that the flood itself was caused when the Earth passed through the tail of a comet, which, it was known by that time, are composed largely of water. His analysis was very detailed, and similar ideas were promoted in the 1960s by other creationists postulating causes for the global flood, along with similarity to the ideas of Immanuel Velikovsky. However, many of them are in direct conflict with contemporary scientific understandings, and comets are not mentioned in flood accounts.

== Editions ==
- Whiston, William (1696). A New Theory of the Earth, From its Original, to the Consummation of All Things, Where the Creation of the World in Six Days, the Universal Deluge, And the General Conflagration, As laid down in the Holy Scriptures, Are Shewn to be perfectly agreeable to Reason and Philosophy. London: Benjamin Tooke.

== External links and sources ==
- "William Whiston and the Deluge" by Immanuel Velikovsky
- "Whiston's Flood"
- "William Whiston, The Universal Deluge, and a Terrible Spectacle" by Roomet Jakapi (PDF)
- Bibliography for William Whiston at the LucasianChair.org the homepage of the Lucasian Chair of Mathematics at Cambridge University
- A New Theory of the Earth - full digital facsimile at Linda Hall Library
