= Silvester's Gardens =

Silvester's Gardens was an area located in the parish of Clerkenwell, London.

== Evidence ==
Silvester's Gardens is mentioned in several eighteenth-century sources:

1. Clerkenwell parish records: births, burials, marriages.
2. London newspapers - between 1739 and 1742 - mentioned Silvester's Gardens as the venue of a para-masonic group of male and female theatre folk calling themselves Modern Masons. For example, the announcement of a benefit performance of The Beggar's Opera at Covent Garden in August 1739:
  "For the Entertainment of the Grand Master, and the Worthy Brothers and Sisters of the Honourable Community of Modern Free-Masons [...] Tickets to be had [...] at the Lodge, at Silvester's-Gardens, near Cold-Bath Fields." [London Daily Post and General Advertiser (Friday 10 August 1739)]
  This was one of several groups unsympathetic to the Ministry of Prime Minister Robert Walpole that made works in support of the anti-Walpole Patriot Opposition, a.k.a. the Patriot Party.
  Among the stage–names associated with the Modern Masons we find, for example: Theophilus Cibber (1703-58), Mrs. Villeneuve (née Elizabeth Oates) (fl. 1735–1752), Elizabeth Vincent (1708-?), and Thomas Walker (1698-1744).
3. Legal documents. For example, in a marriage agreement of 1760 concerning another piece of land in Clerkenwell the location of Sylvester's Gardens is identifiable:
  a piece of ground formerly used as a laystall abutting SW on the road from London to Hampstead and NW on the road to the Ducking Pond, NE on gardens known as Silvester's gardens, SE on the road leading to the Bridewell Walk.
