= William Wall (theologian) =

British priest (1647–1728)

William Wall (6 January 1647 – 13 November 1728) was a British priest in the Church of England who wrote extensively on the doctrine of infant baptism. He was generally an apologist for the English church and sought to maintain peace between it and the Anabaptists.

He was born in Kent, he attended Harrow School and got his BA from The Queen's College, Oxford in 1667 and his MA in 1670. After ordination, he took the living in Shoreham, Kent, which he worked at until his death. According to his obituary in the Gentleman's Magazine in 1784, he was offered more lucrative positions, but he refused out of loyalty to his parish.

His contribution to theology came in the form of A History of Infant Baptism in 1705. David Russen had written an anti-Baptist tract entitled Fundamentals without Foundation in 1703, and this had been answered by the Baptist Joseph Stennett in An Answer to Mr. David Russen's Book in 1704. Wall, who knew and respected Stennett, consulted with him and then answered with A History of Infant Baptism. Wall was answered in turn by John Gale in Reflections on Mr. Wall's History in 1711. Wall's book was enormously successful. He cited numerous patristic sources for the practice of infant baptism and yet pleaded with his opponents not to allow such a minor point to tear the church apart. His work was expanded in a second edition in 1707 and a third edition of 1720. Oxford awarded him the Doctor of divinity degree in 1720 for the work, and John Wesley excerpted it in his own works on the question. Despite being the primary voice against Baptist causes, Wall was sincere in his wishes for unity, and he met with his opponent, Mr. Gale, in 1719.

Wall's wife, Catharine (née Davenant) died at the age of 48, and Wall himself died at an advanced age and was buried in his parish.

== Other works ==
- Critical Notes on the Old Testament:: Wherein the Present Hebrew Text is Explained, and in Many Places Amended, from the Ancient Versions, More Particularly from that of the LXXII. Drawn Up in the Order the Several Books Were Written, Or May Most Conveniently be Read. To which is Prefix'd, a Large Introduction, Adjusting the Authority of the Masoretic Bible, and Vindicating it from the Objections of Mr. Whiston, and the Author of the Grounds and Reasons of the Christian Religion, (Two Volumes), 1734. Vol. 1, Vol. 2.
