= Richard Brocklesby (priest) =

Richard Brocklesby (1636–1714) was an English non-abjuring clergyman.

== Life ==
Brocklesby was born at Tealby, near Market Rasen, Lincolnshire. His father was George Brocklesby, gentleman. He was educated at Caistor Grammar School, and as a sizar at Sidney Sussex College, Cambridge. He graduated B.A. in 1657 and M.A. in 1660. Some time between 1662 and 1674 he was instituted to the rectory of Folkingham, Lincolnshire. No sympathy with the Jacobite party is to be inferred from his declining to abjure.

Brocklesby died at Stamford in 1714 (probably in February), and was buried at Folkingham.

== Works ==
Brocklesby retired to Stamford, and employed his leisure in composing an opus magnum, entitled An Explication of the Gospel Theism and the Divinity of the Christian Religion. Containing the True Account of the System of the Universe, and of the Christian Trinity. … By Richard Brocklesby, a Christian Trinitarian (1706) It is crammed with reading from sages, the Church Fathers, the schoolmen, travellers, and poets; it uses terminology of the writer's own. Brocklesby denies the eternal generation of Jesus Christ, and even his pre-existence; but asserts his consubstantiality as God-man begotten of God, 'an humane-divine person' (see especially bk. vi., 'The Idea of the Lord the Son'). He places the abode of Christ in heaven, from his coming of age to his public mission (p. 1019 sq.), though he calls the kindred notion of Socinus 'wild and pedantic.' The only Socinian writers whom he directly quotes are György Enyedi, Krell, and the English Unitarian Tracts. He does not know Michael Servetus (p. 158) at first hand; Acontius (pp. 819, 821) he values; and Spinoza (p. 785) he cites with modified approval.

John Maxwell, prebendary of Connor, issued in 1727 an English version (A Treatise of the Laws of Nature) of Bishop Richard Cumberland's De Legibus Naturæ (1672). Out of Brocklesby's book, as he says on his title-page, Maxwell carved two introductory essays and a supplementary dissertation. He simplifies Brocklesby's style, omits his theology, and adds some new material from other sources.

== Legacy ==
Brocklesby's will (dated 3 August 1713, codicils 30 January and 7 February 1714, proved 13 August 1714) was to have been included in the second volume of Peck's Desiderata Curiosa (1735), but was left for a third volume, which never appeared. Out of considerable landed property in Lincolnshire and Huntingdonshire, a house at Stamford, etc., Brocklesby founded schools at Folkingham and Kirkby-on-Bain, Lincolnshire, and Pidley, Huntingdonshire, to teach poor children their catechism and to read the Bible. The charitable bequests are very numerous, and some rather singular. A complicated scheme for the distribution of bibles in five counties was to come into effect "if the propagation of the gospel in the Eastern parts totally faileth, or doth not considerably succeed and prosper". A sum of £150 is left towards rebuilding the parish church of Wilsthorpe, Lincolnshire; £150 each for the benefit of the communities of French and Dutch refugees; and £10 each to eight presbyterian ministers. A bequest of £10 to William Whiston was revoked by the first codicil. Brocklesby left two libraries. That at Stamford was sold by auction; the catalogue, Stamford, 1714, contains the titles of many rare volumes of the Socinian school. His library in London was left to be disposed of at the discretion of John Heptinstall, his printer, and William Turner, schoolmaster of Stamford.
