= William Dade =

English cleric and antiquary

William Dade (c.1740–1790) was an English cleric and antiquary.

== Life ==
Born at Burton Agnes in the East Riding of Yorkshire about 1740, he was son of Thomas Dade, vicar of the parish, by his wife Mary Norton. He was educated under Mr. Cotes of Shipton, Mr. Bowness in Holderness, and at Newcome's School in Hackney. He went on to St John's College, Cambridge, where he was admitted in 1759.

In 1763 Dade received holy orders from Archbishop Robert Hay Drummond, and he became successively rector of St. Mary's, Castlegate in York, curate of the perpetual curacy of St. Olave's, Marygate without Bootham Bar, also in the city; and rector of Barmston, near Bridlington. He was elected a fellow of the Society of Antiquaries of London in 1783.

Dade died at Barmston on 2 August 1790.

== Dade registers ==
Dade championed parish registers that included extra personal details. His ideas on registration forms were taken up by Archbishop William Markham, who required them in the diocese of York from his visitation of 1777. These and related registers are now known as "Dade registers".

== Works ==
Dade published Proposals for the History and Antiquities of Holderness (1783) with a number of copper-plates, to go to press as soon as he had obtained 240 subscribers. Portions of the work were printed at York in 1784, with engravings, and the proof-sheets of these fragments, with the author's manuscript notes and corrections, are in the British Library. Ill-health and other circumstances prevented the completion of the work.

Some time after Dade's death, his manuscripts were given to George Poulson, the historian of Beverley, who rearranged and expanded them, publishing The History and Antiquities of the Seignory of Holderness. There was also published A Series of seventeen Views of Churches, Monuments, and other Antiquities, originally engraved for Dade's "History of Holderness", Hull, 1835. Those plates were originally published in Poulson's Holderness when it was in part publication, but were later replaced for the complete work; the old engravings were sold separately as the Views.

Dade also compiled an Alphabetical Register of Marriages, Births, and Burials of considerable Persons in the county of York, in manuscript.

== Notes ==
Attribution

This article incorporates text from a publication now in the public domain: Stephen, Leslie, ed. (1888). "Dade, William". Dictionary of National Biography. Vol. 13. London: Smith, Elder & Co.
