= Van Musschenbroek vacuum pump =

Scientific instrument

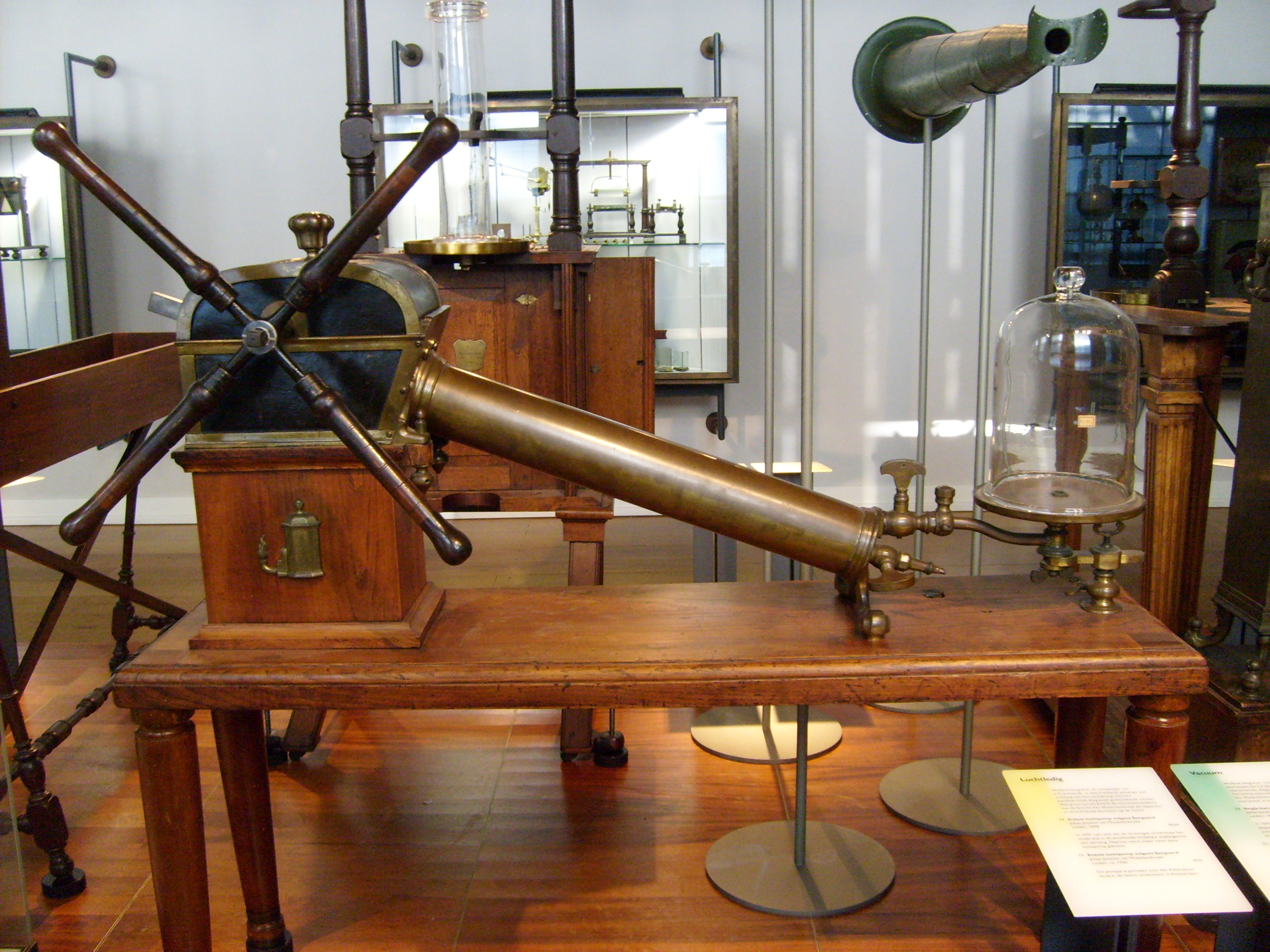
The 1698 van Musschenbroek vacuum pump at Museum Boerhaave, before it was moved to the University Museum of Groningen. The pump contains a chamber, a diagonal barrel and a main house with four spanners. All are connected to a wooden base. Turning the spanners counter-clockwise will pull up the piston and create vacuum in the barrel. The 'Oosterse Lamp' seal of the van Musschenbroeks is placed on the wooden base of the main house.

The van Musschenbroek vacuum pump is an instrument from the late 17th century constructed by the Dutch craftsman Johannes Joosten van Musschenbroek. A series of pumps were designed and produced over the years, with the 1698-model as one of the more prominent examples. It was based on an air pump design by Wolferdus Senguerdius. This model was used to study fluids (gas or liquid) at the University of Groningen. The pump enabled physical, chemical and medical experiments to give a more illustrative explanation of the scientific theories that were presented to the students of the university. This use of experimental demonstrations during teaching was relatively new in Europe at the time.

The instrument is currently part of the collection at the University Museum of Groningen in the Netherlands.

== Background ==
Around 1675, the two craftsmen brothers Samuel and Johan van Musschenbroek switched from manufacturing oil lamps to specializing in scientific instrument making. They had their own workshop in Leiden, the Netherlands. The older brother Samuel was the main craftsman in the workshop, but following his death in 1681 at the age of 41, Johan took over the family business. In the following years, the workshop became one of Europe's most important suppliers of air pumps, microscopes and other instruments. Their pumps were exported mainly to Germany, Italy, Scotland and Sweden.

=== Evolution of the pump design ===
The design of vacuum pumps evolved over time in the van Musschenbroek workshop. The first produced vacuum pump in the workshop was a request by Burchard de Volder, a professor of physics at the Leiden University. The pump was constructed in 1675 and was based on a design by Robert Hooke. This instrument never became a bestseller in the workshop due to its cumbersomeness and its impracticality since it required two men to operate.

To improve the pump, Wolferd Senguerd, also a professor of Leiden University, designed a simplified version of the pump without changing its function. This adapted the instrument into a more convenient air pump which could be operated single-handed. The pump design was published in Senguerd's "Philosophia Naturalis" in 1685.

Meanwhile, around 1679 in France, Denis Papin, a French physicist and inventor, had made a similar design and construction, but was never credited of his work by Senguerd. The Papin pump was only successful in France.

Johan van Musschenbroek used the design of Senguerd to construct the 1698 van Musschenbroek vacuum pump. This pump was amongst at least 40 others, where nine is still preserved today. It is estimated that three pumps were produced every two years when production was at its highest. The pump became a great success in most of Europe except for France. The vacuum pump was fairly expensive. It was sold with accessories for 500 guilders, equal to about half a professor's annual salary at the time. Over time a cheaper alternative was offered for less than 175 guilders; a horizontal version mentioned as 'poor man's pump', which sold well.

=== The van Musschenbroek workshop ===
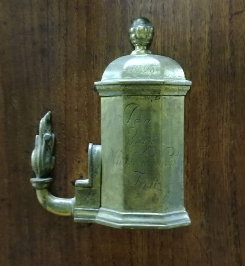
The van Musschenbroek family seal 'Oosterse Lamp' meaning 'Eastern Lamp' at the base of the 1698 van Musschenbroek vacuum pump. In the lower left corner of the lamp, the crossed keys of the Leiden city arms are engraved. On the lamp it says: "1698, Jan van Musschenbroek Fecit" indicating the creator of the instrument. Johannes often used the abbreviations Johan or Jan, so even though his son Jan van Musschenbroek would grow up to be a very successful and skilled instrumental craftsman himself, it wasn't him who made the pump in 1698, since he was only 11 years old at the time.

The workshop pioneered the European instrument market by selling high grade instruments. It was one of the first workshops to sell instruments, at a fixed price, through a catalogue instead of negotiating the price with each customer. In the period 1660 to 1700, production switched from oil lamps to scientific instruments, mainly microscopes and air pumps. These were primarily sold to the University of Leiden, located next to the workshop. At the beginning of the 18th century, the workshop provided a much larger variety of equipment and also exported outside the Dutch Republic. Extraordinary to other scientific instrumental workshops of the time, the Musschenbroek workshop offered anatomical and surgical instruments. The workshop also produced and exported thermometers, barometers, central forces-, and falling objects machines.

Some of the van Musschenbroek instruments can be recognized by the family seal, 'Oosterse Lamp'. The seal is an Oriental brass lamp with the crossed keys of the Leiden city arms. It is a symbol of the workshop's origin started by Joost van Musschenbroek, a Dutch lampmaker and the father of Samuel- and Johan van Musschenbroek. The story of the family-driven workshop ended with the death of Jan Joosten van Musschenbroek, the son of Johan van Musschenbroek, in 1748.

== Use ==
The van Musschenbroek vacuum pump is used to transport a fluid from one place (the chamber) to another (the receiver). It was mainly used for air to create vacuum. The pump was used to study the transport of fluids and thereby its properties (fluid dynamics), but also the behavior of fluids under reduced pressure.

=== Construction ===
The 1698 van Musschenbroek vacuum pump contains a number of items:

- A chamber for experiments
- A pipe connected to a diagonal barrel containing a valve
- A diagonal barrel, containing a piston, screwed to a wooden base. The barrel contains two pipes which can be opened or closed using the valves. Both pipes are connected to the main house. The pipe connected to the chamber allows transport of material from the chamber to the receiving end at vacuum.
- A receiving end where the fluid (often air) is transferred to.
- Four spanners connected to a main house, used to pull up the piston and thereby create vacuum.

The 1698 van Musschenbroek vacuum pump has the 'Oosterse Lamp' seal placed on the wooden base of the main house. On the seal, it says: "1698, Jan van Musschenbroek Fecit", meaning "1698, made by Jan van Musschenbroek" referring to Johan van Musschenbroek.

=== Operation ===
During an experiment, the following steps are performed:

1. The object/compound of interest is placed within the chamber.
2. The valves are opened to allow free passage of the fluid (often air).
3. The spanners are then turned counter-clockwise to pull up the piston and thereby create vacuum.
4. Because of the vacuum, the fluid (often air) is transferred from the chamber, through the pipes and into the receiver. No receiver is needed if the fluid removed from the chamber is air.

=== Examples of experiments ===
Johan van Musschenbroek described a set of experiments that could be performed using his vacuum pump. His two main experiments described: 1) the inability of sound movement in vacuum and 2) the facilitation of movement of mercury in vacuum.

The first experiment was made using a clock inside the chamber. Van Musschenbroek demonstrated that no sound was present at the receiving end, suggesting that sound cannot travel in vacuum.

The other experiment was made by placing mercury, or another fluid, at vacuum to facilitate movement of the fluid. The experiment was suggested to be used for anatomical experiments e.g. to visualize the arteries of the human body using a colored substance, like mercury.

=== The discovery of portable mercurial phosphor by Johann Bernoulli ===
Johann Bernoulli taught physics at University of Groningen between 1695 and 1705. He acquired the 1698 van Musschenbroek vacuum pump from the Musschenbroek workshop in early 1698 along with other instruments expecting "not to do anything important" and only to "amuse our students with mathematico-physical experiments". In 1700 Bernoulli proved himself wrong. When studying barometric light with the pump, he discovered that the bright light caused by electroluminescence when making vacuum in a mercury-filled container, would improve when adding phosphorus compounds. This resulted in the discovery of portable mercurial phosphorus, which consisted of a light-emitting container with mercurial and phosphorus compounds under vacuum. To the delight of Bernoulli, Johan van Musschenbroek optimized his design, and made small vials containing mercury at vacuum. The vial could be sealed and sold as portable, cold, bottled light, which became very popular at the time as an alternative to warm light from candles and fires. Johan van Musschenbroek sold many air-tight vials containing the mercurial phosphorus of Bernoulli. Johann Bernoulli described Johan van Musschenbroek as "a Leiden mechanic with great experience and singular dexterity in the construction of instruments, who has also made those which I use". Bernoulli also had such praise for the 1698 van Musschenbroek vacuum pump that he boasted it could make vacuum of 0.0001 atmosphere, and maintain the pressure for almost 24 hours, although the actual performance of the pump must have been worse due to the technology limits of the time.
