= James Greenwood (grammarian) =

English grammarian

James Greenwood (c. 1683 – 1737) was an English grammarian.

== Life ==
Greenwood was for some time usher to Benjamin Morland (1657–?) at Hackney Academy, but soon after 1711 opened a boarding-school at Woodford, Essex. At midsummer 1721, when Morland became high-master, he was appointed surmaster of St. Paul's School, London, a post which he held until his death on 12 September 1737. He left a widow, Susannah.

== Works ==
He is mostly known as the author of An Essay towards a practical English Grammar. Describing the Genius and Nature of the English Tongue, &c., 12mo, London, 1711; 2nd edit. 1722; 3rd edit. 1729; 5th edit. 1753 (reprinted by the University of Michigan Library, 2009). It received the praises of Andrew Ross, Professor of Humanity at the University of Glasgow, Dr. George Hickes, John Chamberlayne, and Isaac Watts, who in his Art of Reading and Writing English considered that Greenwood had shown in his book "the deep Knowledge, without the haughty Airs of a Critick". At Watts's suggestion Greenwood afterwards published an abridgment under the title of The Royal English Grammar, which he dedicated to the Princess of Wales; the fourth edition of this appeared in 1750, an eighth in 1770.

The appearance of two other English grammars by John Brightland (d. 1717) and Michael Mattaire at about the same time called forth an anonymous attack on all three books, entitled Bellum Grammatical; or the Grammatical Battel Royal. In Reflections on the three English Grammars publish'd in about a year last past, 8vo, London, 1712.

Greenwood also wrote The London Vocabulary, English and Latin: put into a new Method proper to acquaint the Learner with Things, as well as Pure Latin Words. Adorn'd with Twenty Six Pictures, &c., 3rd edition, 12mo, London 1713 (many editions, both English and American). It is, however, nothing more than an abridgment of Jan Amos Komensky's Orbis Pictura. Greenwood's last work was The Virgin Muse. Being a Collection of Poems from our most celebrated English Poets … To which are added some Copies of Verses never before printed; with notes &c., 12mo, London, 1717; 2nd edition, 1722. It does not appear that Greenwood himself was a contributor.
