= John Gale (theologian) =

British Baptist theologian (1680–1721)

John Gale (1680–1721) was a British Baptist theologian. He was not widely known until the controversy over William Wall's work on infant baptism appeared.

He studied at Leiden University and received a Master of Arts degree and Ph.D. in 1699. After studying at Leiden, Gale went to Amsterdam, where he met Le Clerc. Leiden offered him a doctor of divinity if he agreed to Puritan doctrine. He would not, on principle.

His work against infant baptism was composed in 1705–1706 as a series of letters to Wall. These were collected and published in 1711 as Reflections on Mr. Wall's History of Infant Baptism. Gale was a superb scholar of Hebrew, Greek and Latin, and he combatted Wall's patristic readings by arguing that the antiquity of infant baptism is not certain. He also accused Wall of doing what Wall said he most sought to avoid: elevating a minor doctrinal point into a matter of schism. William Wotton praised Gale's work.

Gale began preaching at Paul's Alley Barbican, but he was never ordained and would not accept a regular position. Instead, he traveled from one Baptist congregation to another, speaking. He also joined the "Society for Promoting Primitive Christianity." He was introduced to Benjamin Hoadly and the Lord Chancellor Peter King. In 1721, when he was just forty-one years old, he caught a fever and died. He left little money for his widow, and congregationalists collected a subscription to enable her to open a coffee shop in Finch Lane, London.
