= The Suspicious Husband =

1747 play

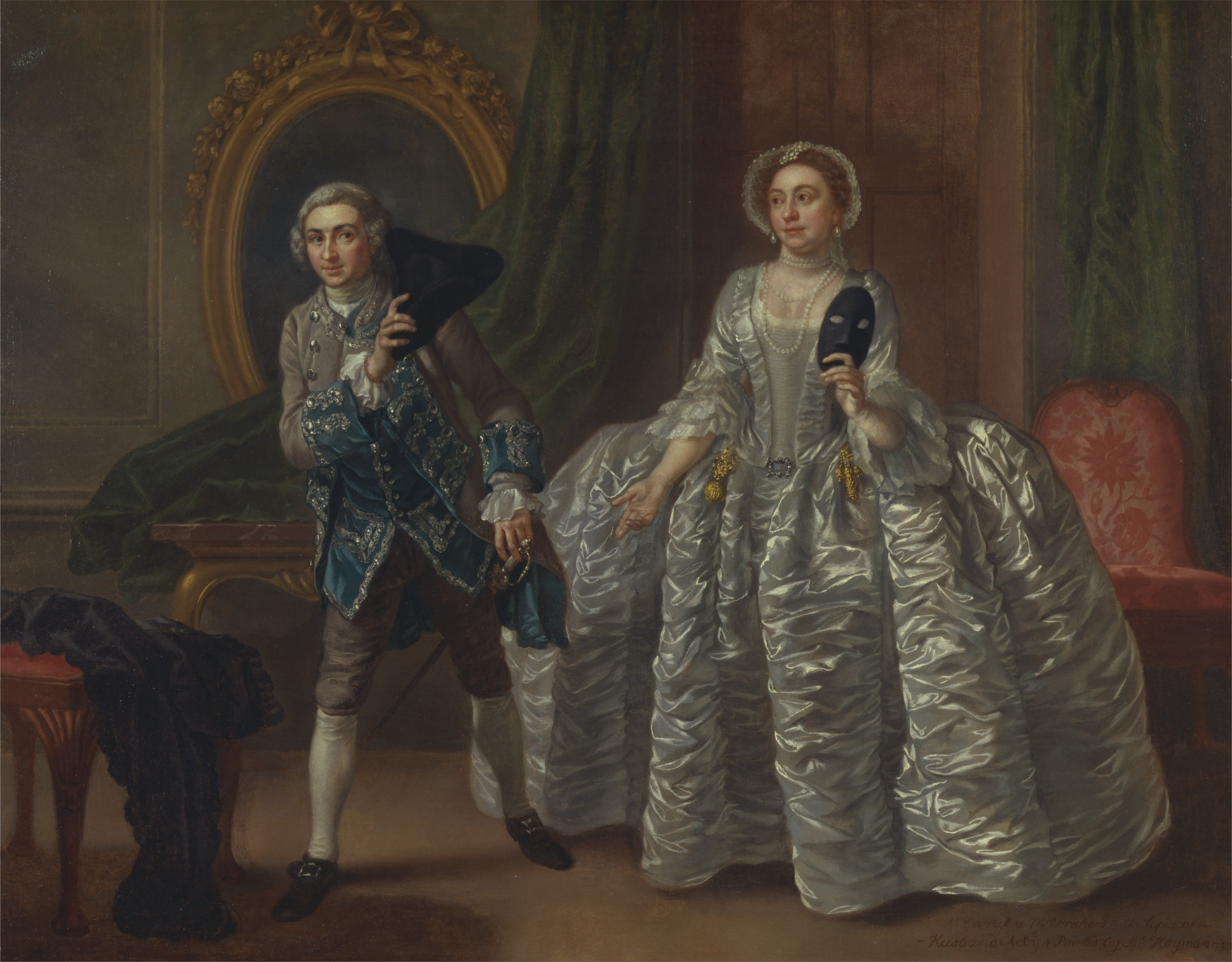
- David Garrick and Hannah Pritchard in The Suspicious Husband
- Original language: English
- Written by: Benjamin Hoadly
- Genre: Comedy

Premiere
- Date: 12 February 1747
- Place: Covent Garden Theatre

The Suspicious Husband is a 1747 comedy play by the British writer Benjamin Hoadly.

It premiered at the Covent Garden Theatre in February 1747. The original cast included David Garrick as Ranger, Roger Bridgewater as Strictland, Lacy Ryan as Frankly, William Havard as Bellamy, Henry Woodward as Jack Meggot, Hannah Pritchard as Clarinda, Elizabeth Vincent as Jacintha and Jane Hippisley as Lucetta.

== Bibliography ==
- Nicoll, Allardyce. A History of Early Eighteenth Century Drama: 1700-1750. CUP Archive, 1927.
