= James Greenwood (cricketer) =

English cricketer

Personal information
- Full name: James Greenwood

Domestic team information
- Years: Team
- 1842–1845: Hampshire

Career statistics
Competition	FC
Matches	7
Runs scored	83
Batting average	7.54
100s/50s	–/–
Top score	40
Balls bowled	–
Wickets	–
Bowling average	–
5 wickets in innings	–
10 wickets in match	–
Best bowling	–
Catches/stumpings	1/–
- Source: Cricinfo, 4 March 2010

James Greenwood (1806 in England – 26 September 1870) was an amateur English cricketer who made his first-class debut for Hampshire against Marylebone Cricket Club (MCC) in 1842. Greenwood played 7 first-class matches for Hampshire from 1842 to 1845, with his final appearance for the county coming against Petworth.

In his 7 matches for the county he scored 83 runs at a batting average of 7.54 and a high score of 40.

Greenwood died at Great Marlow, Buckinghamshire on 26 September 1870.
