= Benjamin Hoadly (physician) =

Benjamin Hoadly (1706–1757) was an English physician, known also as a dramatist.

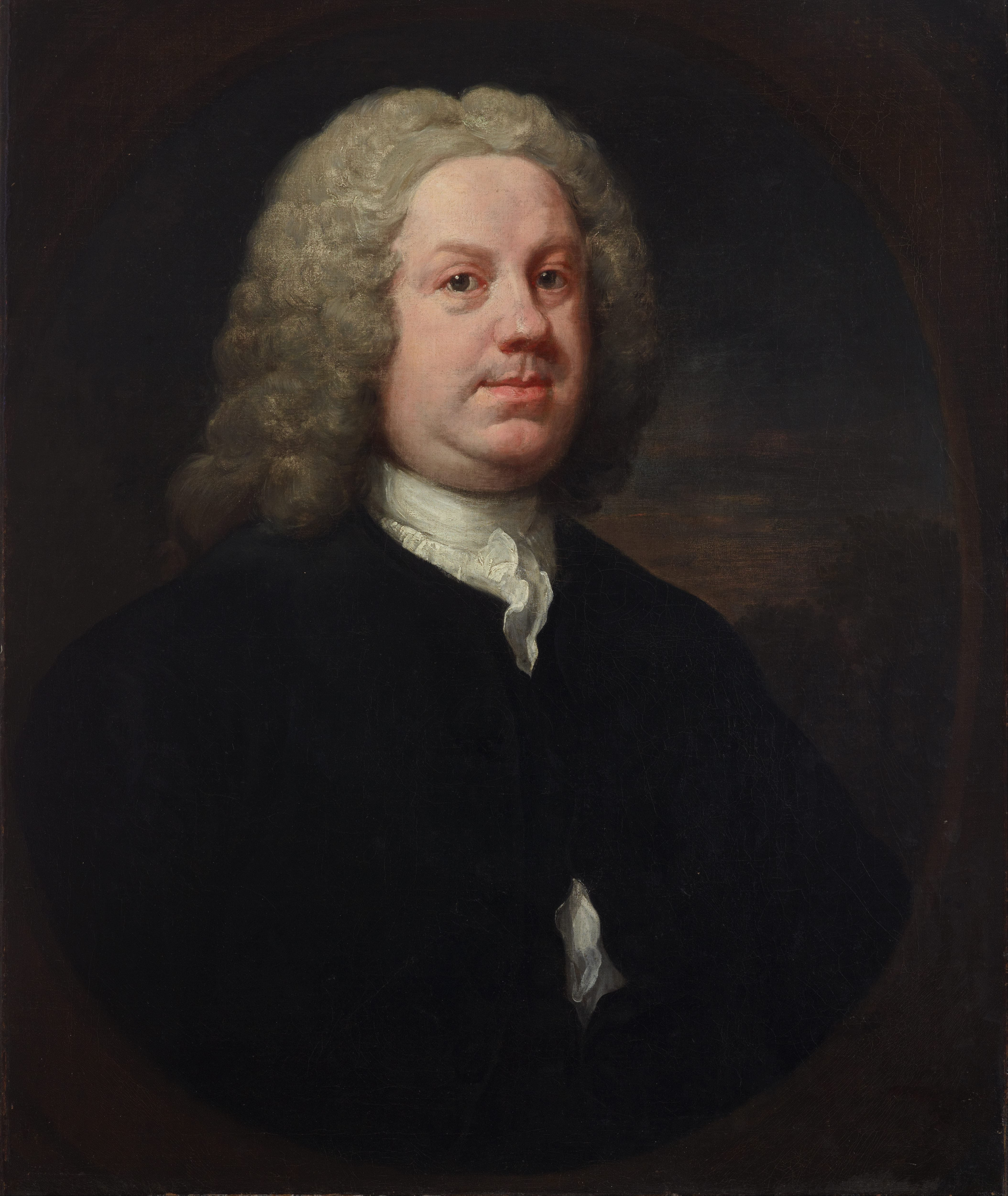
Dr. Benjamin Hoadly, portrait by William Hogarth

== Life ==
The son of Benjamin Hoadly, bishop of Winchester, he was born on 10 February 1706 in Broad Street, London. He was sent to Newcome's academy at Hackney, and then to Corpus Christi College, Cambridge, where he was admitted on 8 April 1722. He read mathematics, and attended the lectures of Nicholas Saunderson. He graduated M.B. 1727, and M.D. April 1728, having already been elected a Fellow of the Royal Society. He was registrar of Hereford while his father was bishop there (1721–4).

Hoadly settled in London, and was elected a fellow of the Royal College of Physicians 29 December 1736. In the following spring he delivered the Gulstonian lectures on the organs of respiration, which were printed. In 1739 he was elected censor, and in 1742 delivered a commonplace Harveian oration, which was printed. On 9 June 1742 he was made physician to the king's household, and on 4 January 1746 physician to the household of Frederick, Prince of Wales. He died at Chelsea on 10 August 1757.

== Works ==
Hoadly was fond of the stage, and was author of The Suspicious Husband, a comedy, which was first acted at Covent Garden Theatre on 12 February 1747. David Garrick wrote a prologue for it, and acted the part of Ranger. It hit the popular taste, was often repeated on the stage, and was published in 1747 with a dedication to the king. The critics Samuel Foote and John Genest also praised it. A farce by Charles Macklin, The Suspicious Husband Criticized, was produced at Drury Lane on 24 March 1747.

Hoadly also wrote a comedy The Tatlers, which was acted at Covent Garden on 29 April 1797 for Joseph George Holman's benefit, but was never printed. In 1756 he published Observations on a series of Electrical Experiments by Dr. Hoadly and Mr. Wilson.

== Family ==
Hoadly married, first, Elizabeth, daughter of Henry Betts, and by her had one son, Benjamin; secondly, Anne, daughter of General Armstrong.
