= Benjamin Hoadly =

English bishop (1676–1761); instigator of the Bangorian controversy

The Right Reverend Benjamin Hoadly
- Bishop of Winchester
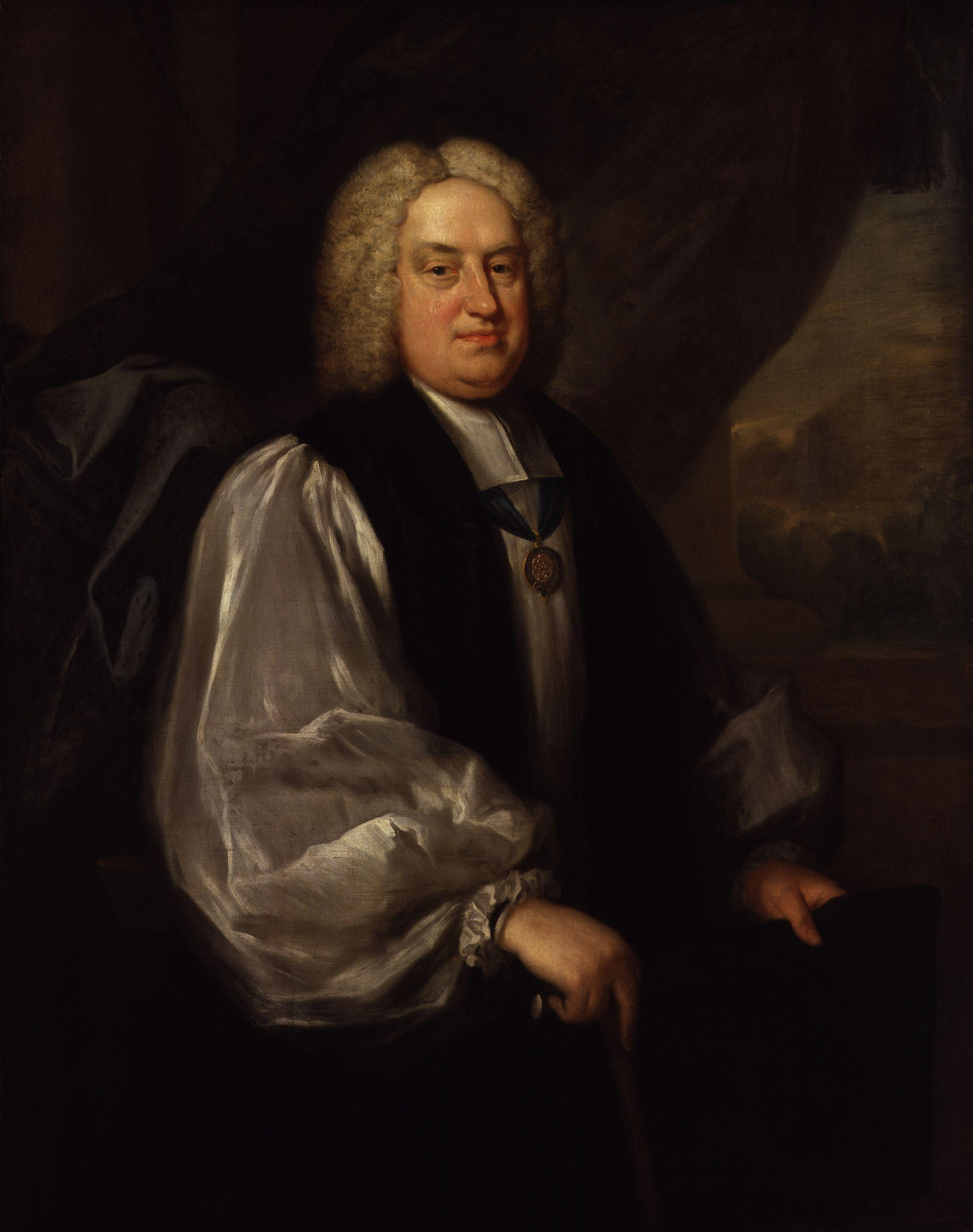
- Benjamin Hoadly, painted by Sarah Hoadly
- Diocese: Diocese of Winchester
- In office: 1734–1761 (died)
- Predecessor: Richard Willis
- Successor: John Thomas
- Other posts: Bishop of Bangor (1716–1721); Bishop of Hereford (6 October 1721 {elected

Personal details
- Born: 14 November 1676 Westerham, Kent, England
- Died: 17 April 1761 (aged 84) Chelsea, Middlesex, Great Britain
- Buried: Winchester Cathedral
- Denomination: Anglican
- Residence: Winchester House, Chelsea (official; at death)
- Parents: Samuel Hoadly & Martha Hoadly (née Pickering)
- Spouse: 1. Sarah Hoadly (née Curtis; 30 May 1701 {married
- Children: John Hoadly, four other sons (plus two stillborn; all with Sarah)
- Profession: lecturer
- Education: St Catharine's College, Cambridge

Ordination history of Benjamin Hoadly
History
Diaconal ordination
- Ordained by: Henry Compton, Bishop of London
- Date: 18 December 1698
- Place: St Paul's Cathedral
Priestly ordination
- Ordained by: Compton
- Date: 22 December 1700
- Place: St Paul's
Episcopal consecration
- Date: c. 1716

Benjamin Hoadly (14 November 1676 – 17 April 1761) was an English clergyman, who was successively Bishop of Bangor, of Hereford, of Salisbury, and finally of Winchester. He is best known as the initiator of the Bangorian Controversy.

== Life ==
He was educated at St Catharine's College, Cambridge and ordained a priest in 1700. He was rector of St Peter-le-Poer, London, from 1704 to 1724, and of St Leonard's, Streatham, from 1710 to 1723. His participation in controversy began at the beginning of his career, when he advocated conformity of the religious rites from the Scottish and English churches for the sake of union. He became a leader of the low church and found favour with the Whig party and was regarded as one of the more radical Commonwealthmen.

He battled with Francis Atterbury, who was the spokesman for the high church group and Tory leader on the subject of passive obedience and non-resistance (i.e. obedience of divines that would not involve swearing allegiance or changing their eucharistic rites but would also not involve denunciation of the Established Church practices). The House of Commons, dominated by Whigs, recommended him to Queen Anne, and he became rector of Streatham in 1710. When George I succeeded to the throne, he became chaplain to the King and made bishop of Bangor in 1716. He took up the See on the confirmation of his election, at St Mary-le-Bow on 17 March 1716.

In 1717, his sermon on "The Nature of the Kingdom of Christ" provoked the Bangorian controversy. He was then translated three more times, taking up different bishoprics. He maintained that the eucharist was purely a commemorative act without any divine intervention. During his time as bishop, he rarely visited his dioceses and lived, instead, in London, where he was very active in politics.

From later summer 1722 to January 1725 Hoadly published letters on contemporary topics, articulating his Whig principles and defending the Glorious Revolution of 1688. The Revolution had created "that Limited Form of Government which is our only Security" and such a government secured freedom of expression, without which Britons would suffer "all the Mischiefs, of Darkness in the Intellectual World, of Baseness in the Moral World, and of Slavery in the Political World". Hoadly also criticised the Pretender, who issued a declaration that he would extinguish opposition. Hoadly wrote that he would impose uniformity on all if he ruled: "Not only that he must destroy your Civil and Religious Rights, but that he plainly before-hand has here told You, to your Face, He will do so".

William Hogarth (1697–1764) painted his portrait as Bishop of Winchester and "Prelate of the Most Noble Order of the Garter" about 1743, etched by Bernard Baron (1696–1762). Hoadly's son Benjamin aided Hogarth with his The Analysis of Beauty.

== Selected works ==
- A Defence of the Reasonableness of Conformity (1707)
- A Plain Account of the Nature and End of the Sacrament of the Lord's Supper (1735)
- The Repeal of the Corporation and Test Acts (1736)

== Bibliography ==
- Guglielmo Sanna, Religione e vita publica nell' Inghilterra del '700: Le avventure di Benjamin Hoadly, Milan, FrancoAngeli Storia, 2012
- Robbins, Caroline (1959). The Eighteenth-Century Commonwealthman: Studies in the Transmission, Development, and Circumstance of English Liberal Thought from the Restoration of Charles II until the War with the Thirteen Colonies (1961 ed.).

== Notes ==
Church of England titles
Preceded by John Evans	Bishop of Bangor; 1716–1721	Succeeded by Richard Reynolds
Preceded by Philip Bisse	Bishop of Hereford; 1721–1723	Succeeded by Henry Egerton
Preceded by Richard Willis	Bishop of Salisbury; 1723–1734	Succeeded by Thomas Sherlock
Preceded by Richard Willis	Bishop of Winchester; 1734–1761	Succeeded by John Thomas
