= Le Fanu =

Le Fanu is a surname, also spelled LeFanu. Notable people with the name include

- Alicia Le Fanu (born 1791), Irish poet and writer
- Alicia Sheridan Le Fanu (1753–1817), Irish writer
- Henry Le Fanu (1870–1946), Anglican bishop in Australia
- James Le Fanu (born 1950), British physician, medical journalist and author
- Michael Le Fanu (1913– 1970), British Royal Navy officer, Admiral of the Fleet
- Nicola LeFanu (born 1947), British composer
- Sarah LeFanu (born 1953), Scottish academic and author
- Sheridan Le Fanu (1814–1873), Irish writer of Gothic tales and mystery novels
- Thomas Le Fanu (priest) (1784–1845), Irish Anglican dean
- Thomas Le Fanu (civil servant) (1858-1945), Irish civil servant
- Victor Le Fanu (1865–1939), Irish rugby union player
- William LeFanu (1904–1995), Irish librarian
