= 1763 in literature =

The following literary events and publications occurred in the year 1763.

== Events ==
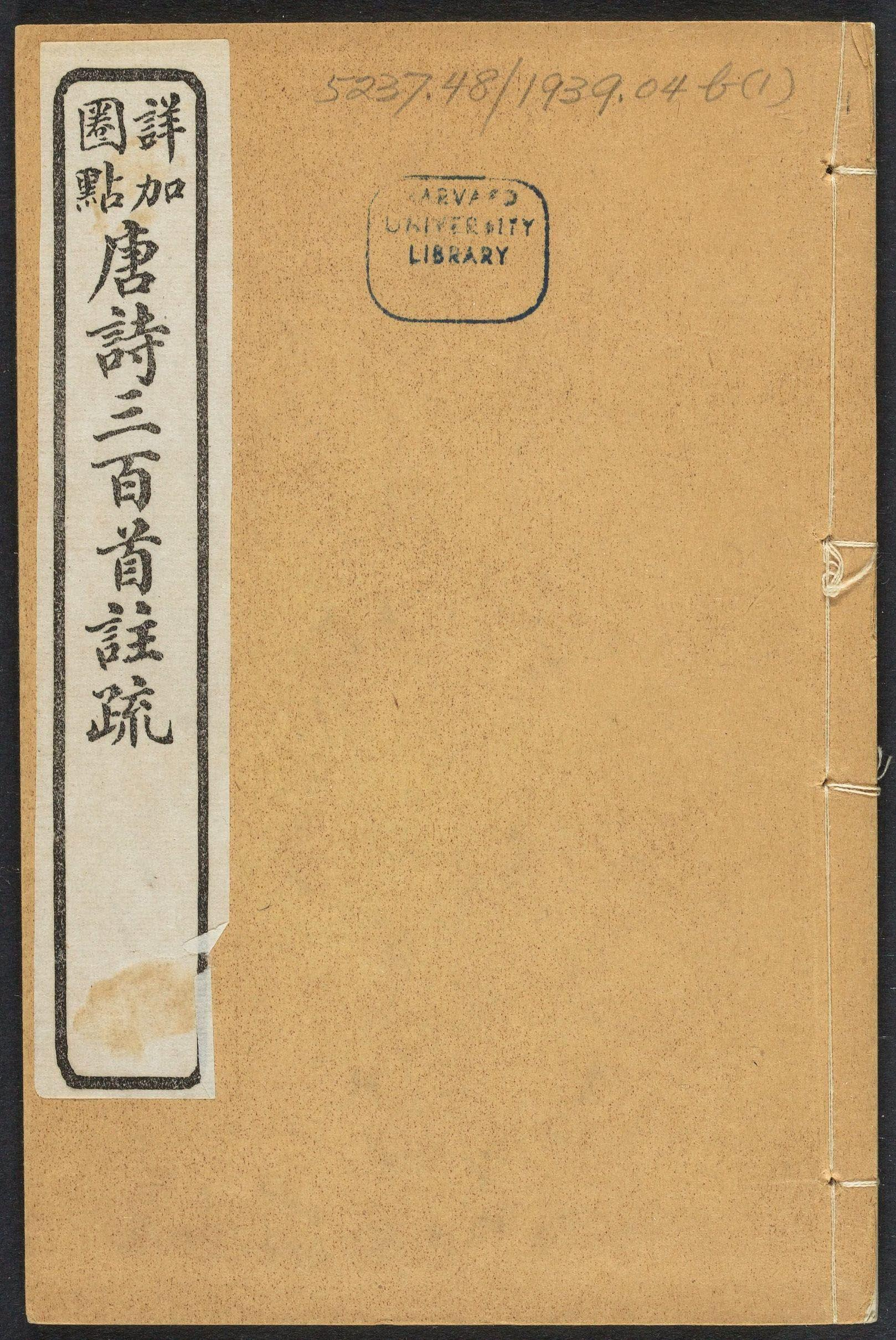
A 1930s edition of the anthology Three Hundred Tang Poems

- January – Christopher Smart's asylum confinement ends at Mr Potter's asylum in London. (He was admitted to St Luke's Hospital for Lunatics in May 1757 and may have been confined before that; he was later moved to Potter's.) While confined, Smart has written A Song to David, published this year, and Jubilate Agno, not published until 1939.
- April 30 – A warrant is issued in Britain for the arrest of John Wilkes for seditious writings in The North Briton
- May 16 – James Boswell is introduced to Samuel Johnson at Thomas Davies's bookshop in Covent Garden, London.
- October 11 – The marriage of Henry Thrale and Hester Thrale takes place. Both later become close friends and companions of Dr Samuel Johnson.
- December 6 – John Wilkes brings a court action for trespass against Robert Wood, after the Lord Chief Justice William Murray, 1st Baron Mansfield rules that parliamentary privilege protects Wilkes from arrest for libel.
- unknown dates
  - Fedor Emin's Nepostoyannaya fortuna, the first Russian novel, is published.
  - The atheist English printer John Baskerville produces an edition of the Bible for Cambridge University Press in his Baskerville typeface.
- probable – Chinese Qing dynasty scholar Sun Zhu compiles Three Hundred Tang Poems, an anthology of poems from the Chinese Tang dynasty (618–907).

== New books ==
=== Prose ===
- Frances Brooke – The History of Lady Julia Mandeville
- James Grieve – English translation of Stepan Krasheninnikov's History of Kamtschatka
- Susannah Minifie and Margaret Minifie – The Histories of Lady Frances S—— and Lady Caroline S——
- John Langhorne – The Letters that Passed Between Theodosius and Constantia
- Cao Xueqin – The Chronicles of the Stone

=== Drama ===
- Isaac Bickerstaffe – Love in a Village (opera)
- George Colman the Elder – The Deuce is in Him
- Nicolás Fernandez de Moratín – Lucrecia
- Samuel Foote
  - The Mayor of Garrett
  - The Trial of Samuel Foote, Esq. for a Libel on Peter Paragraph
- Mary Latter – The Siege of Jerusalem
- David Mallet – Elvira
- Arthur Murphy – The Citizen
- Frances Sheridan
  - The Discovery
  - The Dupe

=== Poetry ===
- Richard Bentley the Younger – Patriotism
- Charles Churchill
  - The Author
  - The Conference
  - An Epistle to William Hogarth
  - The Prophecy of Famine
  - Poems
- John Collier – Tim Bobbin's Toy-shop
- George Keate – The Alps
- Robert Lloyd – The Death of Adam
- James Macpherson (as Ossian) – Temora
- William Mason – Elegies
- James Merrick – Poems
- Giuseppe Parini – Il giorno
- Christopher Smart – A Song to David

=== Non-fiction ===
- Almanach de Gotha (first issue)
- John Ash – Grammatical Institutes
- Thomas Bayes (died 1761) – An Essay Towards Solving a Problem in the Doctrine of Chances
- Hugh Blair – A Critical Dissertation on the Poems of Ossian
- John Brown – A Dissertation on Poetry and Music
- Philip Doddridge – A Course of Lectures on the Principal Subjects in Pneumatology, Ethics, and Divinity
- Immanuel Kant – The Only Possible Argument in Support of a Demonstration of the Existence of God
- Antoine Simon Le Page Du Pratz – History of Louisiana; an English translation, in two volumes, of Histoire de la Louisiane, published in 1758
- Catharine Macaulay – The History of England from the Accession of James I to that of the Brunswick Line
- Mary Wortley Montagu – Letters
- Robert Orme – A History of the Military Transactions of the British Nation in Indostan from the Year 1745
- William Williams Pantycelyn – Atteb Philo-Evangelius i Martha Philopur (Philo-Evangelius's Reply to Martha Philopur)
- Emanuel Swedenborg – Doctrine of Holy Scripture
- Henry Venn – The Complete Duty of Man
- Voltaire – Traité sur la tolérance
- William Warburton – The Doctrine of Grace
- John Wesley – A Survey of the Wisdom of God in the Creation

== Births ==
- January 15 – François-Joseph Talma, French actor (died 1826)
- January 29 – Johann Gottfried Seume, German travel writer (died 1810)
- March 9 – William Cobbett, English political and economic writer (died 1835)
- March 16 – Mary Berry, English dramatist and correspondent (died 1852)
- March 21 – Jean Paul (Johann Paul Friedrich Richter), German novelist (died 1825)
- May 9 – János Batsányi, Hungarian poet and anti-Habsburg activist (died 1845)
- June 15 – Kobayashi Issa, Japanese haiku poet (died 1828)
- July 30 – Samuel Rogers, English poet (died 1855)
- September 2 – Caroline Schelling (Caroline Michaelis), German literary critic (died 1809)
- October 10 – Xavier de Maistre, French soldier and writer (died 1852)
- December 6 – Mary Anne Burges, Scottish religious allegorist (died 1813)
- Unknown dates
  - Huang Peilie, Chinese bibliophile (died 1825)
  - Shen Fu, Chinese chronicler (died c. 1825)

== Deaths ==
- January 11 – Caspar Abel, German poet and theologian (born 1676)
- February 11 – William Shenstone, English poet (born 1714)
- February 12 – Pierre de Marivaux, French novelist and dramatist (born 1688)
- May 3 – George Psalmanazar, French-born impostor and English writer (born c. 1679)
- June 29 – Hedvig Charlotta Nordenflycht, Swedish poet and salonnière (born 1718)
- September 26 – John Byrom, English poet (born 1692)
- December 23 – Antoine François Prévost (Abbé Prévost), French author (born 1697)
- Probable year of death – Cao Xueqin, Chinese novelist (born c. 1715)
