= Op. 46 =

In music, Op. 46 stands for Opus number 46. Compositions that are assigned this number include:

- Arnold – Concerto for Harmonica and Orchestra
- Beethoven – Adelaide
- Bruch – Scottish Fantasy
- Chopin – Allegro de concert
- Diaghilev – The Prodigal Son
- Dvořák – Slavonic Dances
- Elgar – Concert Allegro
- Fauré – Clair de lune
- Granados – Allegro de concierto
- Hennessy – String Quartet No. 1
- Hindemith – Kammermusik
- Holmboe – String Quartet No. 1
- Kabalevsky – Piano Sonata No. 3
- Milhaud – String Quartet No. 4
- Onslow – 3 String Quartets
- Oswald – String Quartet No. 4
- Rubinstein – Violin Concerto
- Schoenberg – A Survivor from Warsaw
- Schumann – Andante and variations for two pianos
- Sibelius – Pelléas et Mélisande, theatre score and suite (1905, arranged 1905)
- Szymanowski – King Roger
- Ullman – String Quartet No. 3
