= Charles Francis Sheridan =

Anglo-Irish lawyer, politician & writer (1750-1806)

Charles Francis Sheridan (June 1750 – 24 June 1806) was an Anglo-Irish lawyer, politician and writer.

== Biography ==
Sheridan was born at 12 Dorset Street, Dublin, the elder son of the actor Thomas Sheridan and Frances Sheridan (née Chamberlaine). His younger brother was Richard Brinsley Sheridan and his sisters were Alicia Sheridan Le Fanu and Betsy Sheridan. He was educated at home by his father until 1754, when the family moved to London after a riot in his father's theatre in Dublin. In 1757, Sheridan and his family returned to Ireland briefly, before then moving to England permanently. From an early age, Sheridan was trained in public speaking by his father.

In May 1777, he was appointed secretary to the British envoy in Sweden. He arrived in the country during the coup d'état which brought Gustavus III to power. He spent three years there and afterwards wrote A history of the late revolution in Sweden (1778), which was well received and later translated into French. In May 1775 he returned to England and entered Lincoln's Inn; he was called to the bar in 1780. His first legal role was as counsel for the Barracks Board.

In 1776 Sheridan was elected to the Irish House of Commons as a Member of Parliament for Belturbet, largely owing to the patronage of his younger brother Richard. In 1779 he published a pamphlet entitled Observations, which related to the right for Ireland to create its own laws. In 1782, Richard secured his brother a position in the Dublin Castle administration as Under-Secretary for Ireland for the military department in support of the Second Rockingham ministry. In 1783 he was elected to represent Rathcormack. Sheridan became associated with the Whig faction, but refused to resign his office when the Whigs lost power, and was accused by his brother of a lack of principle. He was removed from office on 8 August 1789 following the regency crisis, at which point he was granted an annual pension of £1000 by George III.

Sheridan left the Irish Commons in 1790. Disillusioned, he retired from politics and dedicated his final years to futile chemical and mechanical experiments. He often visited London to circulate papers proclaiming new scientific discoveries, but he was not taken seriously in the city's academic circles. In 1793 Sheridan published two pamphlets: the first an essay defending Ireland's rights as an independent kingdom and the second a statement of support for Catholic relief and Edmund Burke.

Sheridan's health failed rapidly and he died on 24 June 1806 at Tunbridge Wells.

In 1783, Sheridan married Letitia Christiana Bolton; they had several children together.

Parliament of Ireland
Preceded by Sir John Coghill, Bt; Robert Birch	Member of Parliament for Belturbet; 1776–1783; With: Robert Birch	Succeeded by Sir Skeffington Smyth, Bt; David La Touche
Preceded by William Tonson; Francis Beamish	Member of Parliament for Rathcormack; 1783–1790; With: Sackville Hamilton (1783–1784); Thomas Orde (1784–1790)	Succeeded by Henry Duquerry; John Philpot Curran
