= Elizabeth Sheridan =

Elizabeth Sheridan may refer to:

- Betsy Sheridan (1756–1837), writer and sister of Richard Brinsley Sheridan
- Elizabeth Ann Linley (1754–1792), singer and spouse of Richard Brinsley Sheridan
- Liz Sheridan (1929–2022), American actress in television and film
