= Thomas Le Fanu =

Thomas Le Fanu may refer to:

- Thomas Le Fanu (priest)
- Thomas Le Fanu (civil servant)
