= Thomas Le Fanu (civil servant) =

Anglo-Irish civil servant

Thomas Philip Le Fanu CB (9 December 1858 – 21 October 1945) was an Anglo-Irish civil servant.

Born in Ireland to a Huguenot family, he was the son of William Richard Le Fanu (1816-1894) and his wife Henrietta Victorine Barrington, daughter of Sir Matthew Barrington, 2nd Baronet. He was educated in England at Haileybury College and Trinity College, Cambridge, whence he graduated as a Bachelor of Arts in 1881.

Le Fanu worked first in the Public Record Office of Ireland from 1881, transferring to the Chief Secretary of Ireland's Office in 1884. He rose to become Private Secretary to the Chief Secretary of Ireland, Augustine Birrell, between 1910 and 1913. In the 1913 New Year Honours he was made a Companion of the Order of the Bath. From 1913 to 1926, through the period when Ireland gained independence, he was Commissioner of Public Works. LeFanu was Vice-President of the Royal Irish Academy from 1918 to 1920 and again from 1925 until 1930. He was President of the Royal Society of Antiquaries of Ireland between 1933 and 1936.

He married Florence Sophia Mabel Sullivan, daughter of the Reverend James Sullivan, on 3 July 1890. They had two children: their daughter Lucie Catherine Le Fanu (1901-1996), who married the educationalist John Traill Christie; and their son William Richard LeFanu (1904-1995), who became a librarian and was the husband of the composer Elizabeth Maconchy. The composer Nicola LeFanu is their granddaughter.
