= The Dupe (play) =

1763 play

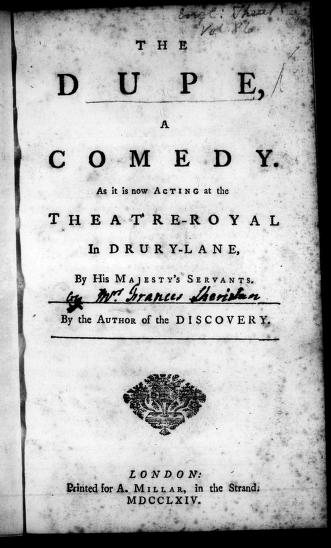
- Original language: English
- Written by: Frances Sheridan
- Genre: Comedy
- Setting: England, present day

Premiere
- Date: 10 December 1763
- Place: Theatre Royal, Drury Lane, London

The Dupe is a 1763 comedy play by the Irish writer Frances Sheridan. It premiered at the Theatre Royal, Drury Lane in London on 10 December 1763. The original cast included Richard Yates as Sir John Woodall, William Havard as Friendly, John Hayman Packer as Wellford, Thomas King as Sharply and Hannah Pritchard as Mrs Etherdown, Kitty Clive as Mrs Friendly. It was one of only two new mainpieces debuting at Drury Lane that year along with a clutch of afterpieces. Sheridan, the mother of the playwright Richard Brinsley Sheridan, was best known for her novel Memoirs of Miss Sidney Bidulph but had enjoyed success with the play The Discovery earlier in the year.

== Bibliography ==
- Greene, John C. Theatre in Dublin, 1745-1820: A Calendar of Performances, Volume 6. Lexington Books, 2011.
- Nicoll, Allardyce. A History of English Drama 1660–1900: Volume III. Cambridge University Press, 2009.
- Hogan, C.B (ed.) The London Stage, 1660–1800: Volume V. Southern Illinois University Press, 1968.
