= John Christie (headmaster) =

John Traill Christie (18 October 1899 – 8 September 1980) was headmaster of Repton School (1932–37) and Westminster School (1937–50), before becoming Principal of Jesus College, Oxford (1949–67).

Christie married Lucie Catherine, only daughter of Thomas Philip Le Fanu; they had two daughters. The elder was Catherine (born 1935); the younger, Jane (born 1936) married Henry Galton Darwin.

Author Roald Dahl attended Repton from 1929, where, according to Boy: Tales of Childhood, a friend named Michael was viciously caned by headmaster Geoffrey Fisher, who later became the Archbishop of Canterbury. However, according to Dahl's biographer Jeremy Treglown, the caning took place in May 1933, a year after Fisher had left Repton and Christie, in fact, was the headmaster concerned.

Hugh Lloyd-Jones, a British classical scholar who became Regius Professor of Greek at Oxford, recounted that, during his years as a student at Westminster School, he had been interested in Modern History before being converted to Classics by Christie.
