= Oboe quintet =

An oboe quintet is a chamber music group of five individuals led by an oboist, or music written for this ensemble.

Usually an oboe quintet consists of an oboe and string quartet. Pieces for five oboes or five members of the oboe family are uncommon (only two are listed below): double reed quintets are not only rare but almost always include a bassoon.

Of the 105 listed quintets, 35 were composed between 1770 and 1825, none in the next 65 years, 3 between 1880 and 1920, 27 between 1920 and 1980, and 40 since.

The most performed and recorded oboe quintets are probably those by Arnold Bax and Arthur Bliss, who both dedicated their pieces to the British oboist Léon Goossens.

== Music for oboe and string quartet ==
These pieces are for oboe, two violins, viola, and cello unless otherwise indicated.

Composer	Title	Year (Note: Years in italics are estimates, which may be off by more than a decade.)	Length (min.)	Publisher	Record label
Bernardo Adam-Ferrero	Homenaje a García Lorca for ob & str qt	2005	8'		NCA
Kalevi Aho	Quintet for oboe & strings	1973	29'		BIS; Finlandia
Richard Arnell	Oboe Quintet	1944	24'		
Jan Bach	Quintet for ob & str	1958	18'	Meadow Music	
Sérgio Azevedo	Oboe Quintet	2004		AVA	
Robert Baksa	Quintet for Oboe and Strings	1972	18'	Carl Fischer; Presser	Capstone
Virko Baley	Orpheus Singing	1994	11'		Cambria; Musicians Showcase
Christian Frederik Barth	Divertissement in G major for ob & str qt	1820		MusicaStorica	
Arnold Bax	Oboe Quintet	1922	17'	Boosey & Hawkes	Recorded by 9+ labels
Howard Blake	Oboe Quintet, Op. 131	1971	13'	Highbridge Music	
Arthur Bliss	Quintet for ob & str, Op. 44, F. 21	1927	20'	OUP; Masters Music	Recorded by 8+ labels
Luigi Boccherini	6 Oboe Quintets, Op. 45, G. 431-6 (Note: 1. 1-5 in G, F, D, A, and E-flat major, and # 6 in D minor.)	1797	9 to 11'	Sikorski; Peters	Capriccio; MHS
William Bolcom	Serenata Notturna	2005	21'	Presser	
Rutland Boughton	Two Pieces for ob & str (Note: Entitled 'Somerset Pastoral' and 'The Passing of the Faery')	1937	8'		Hyperion
Frits Celis	Quintetto, Op. 57 (Note: The oboist also plays the English horn)	1995	21'		Phaedra
Friedrich Cerha	Quintet for ob & str qt	2007	17'		
Brian Cherney	In the Stillness of the Summer Wind	1987	16'		
James Clarke	Oboe Quintet	1992	8'		Metier; Composers’ Art
John Cooney	Taking Liberties (Note: Winner of the RPS Composition Prize 1991. Revised in 1999)	1990	12'	BMIC	
John Corigliano	Aria for ob & str qt (Note: Composer's own adaptation from the 4th movement of his 1975 Oboe concerto)	1985	6'	G. Schirmer	Albany
Lewis Cornwell	Retrospection	1981	6'	AMC	
Donald Crocket	Celestial Mechanics (Note: Commissioned by the Los Angeles Chamber Orchestra)	1990	17'		CRI
Gordon Crosse	Oboe Quintet	1988	15'		
Bernhard Henrik Crusell	Divertimento in C major, Op. 9	1822	10'	Sikorski; Peters; Amadeus	Hyperion, Naxos
Estércio Marques Cunha	Quinteto para oboé e quarteto de cordas	1999		Manuscrito	
Caspar Diethelm	Bucolicon, Op. 202 (Note: Alternatively for oboe, horn, violin, viola and cello)	1982			
Antal Dorati	Notturno and Capriccio	1926	13'		Dux; MD&G Records
Georg Druschetzky	Oboe Quintet in C major	1808	13'		Ambroisie
Dorothy Dushkin	Quintet for Amanda	1956		New Valley	
Gerald Finzi	Interlude for ob & str qt, Op. 21	1936	11'	Boosey & Hawkes	Boston; Carlton; Chandos; Conifer; Hyperion
Christopher Fox	Oboe Quintet	1995	15'	BMIC	Metier
Joseph-François Garnier	Quintette concerto en ut majeur	1790	7'		Koch Schwann
Dorothy Gow	Oboe Quintet in 1 movement	1936	14'		Oboe Classics
Stephen Gryc	Fantasy Variations on a Theme of Béla Bartók (Note: Later arranged for oboe and string orchestra)	1992	11'		Opus One
Daron Hagen	Oboe Quintet	2000	17'	Burning Sled	
Matthew Hindson	Rush : for ob & str qt	2001	9'	Faber	
Gustav Holst	Air and Variations for ob & str qt Three pieces for ob & str qt Op. 2	1896	3'; 13'		Chandos
John-Paul Christopher Jackson	Passacaglia for ob & str qt	1993	6'		
Gordon Jacob	Concerto for ob & str qt (Note: In 1935 arranged for oboe and string orchestra as his "Oboe concerto No 1)	1933	23'	Stainer & Bell	
Bernhard Kaun	Quintet for ob & str	1940		Leeds	
Charles Koechlin	6 Pieces, Op. 179 (Note: Transcribed by the oboist Lajos Lencses. Originally 14 pieces for oboe and piano)	1942		Eschig	
Rodolphe Kreutzer	Grand Quintet in C major	1800	15'	Boosey & Hawkes	Hyperion; Koch
Franz Krommer	Oboe Quintet P VII:12 in C major Oboe Quintet P VII:13 in E flat major	1790	24'; 27'		Naxos
Rolands Kronlaks	Conversion	2000	7'		
Henri Lazarof	Quintet for ob & str qt	1997	15'	Presser	
John Anthony Lennon	Myth of Aeolia	2008	10'	ACA	
Elisabeth Lutyens	The Fall of the Leafe	1966		Olivan	
Andrew Paul MacDonald	Pythikos nomos, Op. 39 (Note: The oboist also plays the English horn and oboe d'amore)	1996	23'		Centrediscs
Elizabeth Maconchy	Oboe Quintet (Note: Receive the Daily Telegraph chamber music prize in 1933)	1932	12'	Chester Music	Oboe Classics; Dutton Vocalion
David Matthews	The Flaying of Marsyas, Op. 42	1987	19'	Faber	Metronome
Robert McBride	Quintet for ob & str	1948	5'	G. Schirmer; ACA	
Darius Milhaud	Les Rêves de Jacob, Op. 294 (Note: For oboe, violin, viola, cello, and double bass.)	1948	17'	Heugel	CPO
Richard Mills	Songs without Words	1998		AMC	
Wolfgang Amadeus Mozart arr. Lucarelli	Oboe Quintet in C minor, K. 406 (Note: For oboe, violin, two violas, and cello. This is a transcription (a.o. by the oboist Humbert Lucarelli) of Mozart's String Quintet No. 2, which was the composer's own arrangement of his earlier Serenade No. 12 for Winds)	1789	24'	IMC	Naxos; Capriccio; Caro Mitis; Amon Ra
Gottfried Müller	Quintet for ob & str qt	1950	19'	Küffner & Drechsler	Cavalli
Vazgen Muradian	Concerto for ob & str qt, Op. 25	1962	25'		Crystal
Josef Mysliveček	6 Quintets for ob & str qt (Note: In B-flat, D, F, C, Ar, and E-flat major.)	1770		(Note: There is one undated manuscript in the Biblioteca Comunale in Treviso)	
Sigismund Neukomm	Quintet for ob & str qt, Op. 8 in B-flat (Note: Written to be played by either oboe or clarinet.)	1809	26'	Amadeus	Pan Classics
Páll Pálsson	September Sonnet	1991	9'	Icelandic Music	
Gabriel Pierné	Piece in G minor for ob & str qt, Op. 5 (Note: Composer's arrangement; originally for oboe and piano)	1883	3'	Masters Music	
Ignace Joseph Pleyel	3 Quintets, B.280-282	1788		J.A.Offenbach	
Quincy Porter	Oboe Quintet (Elegiac) (Note: Porter's last major work; written for the oboist Robert Bloom)	1966	19'	Highgate Press	CRI (CRL235)
David L. Post	Aria for ob & str qt	1994	6'	F.E. Warren	
Roger Redgate	Quintet for Oboe and Strings	2003	6'		Metier
Anton Reicha	Oboe Quintet in F major, Op. 107	1825	26'	Musica Rara	Hyperion; MDG; Pan
Tim Risher	Words and Deeds	1993			
Aulis Sallinen	Echoes from a Play, Op. 66	1990	15'	Novello	
Gerhard Samuel	Two Moods for ob & str qt	1997		LKM	
Peter Seabourne	Soaring (Note: Originally for oboe and piano, in 2003 transcribed for oboe and piano quintet; piano dropped in 2007)	2007	17'		
John Shaffer Smith	Quintet for ob & str qt	1951		Carl Fischer	
Ian Stephens	Quintet for ob & str qt	2014	20'	Composers Edition	Devine Art Recording
Margaret Sutherland	Serenade	1953		AMC	
Toru Takemitsu	Entre-temps for ob & str qt	1986	12'	Schott	Telarc
Joan Tower	Island Prelude	1989	10'	G. Schirmer	Naxos
Antonín Tučapský	Oboe Quintet	1997			
Mark-Anthony Turnage	Cantilena	2001	11'		Onyx Classics
Robert Ward	Quintet for ob & str qt	2005	19'		Albany
Donald Wheelock	Ten bagatelles	1972	9'	King's Crown	Albany
John Woolrich	Oboe Quintet	1998	20'	Faber	
Anton Wranitzky	3 Quintets in C, G minor, F	1800			
Paul Wranitzky	6 Quintets for ob & str, Op. 1	1789		André	

== Other settings ==
Composer	Title	Year	Length (min.)	Publisher	Record label
Jos van Amelsvoort	Quintetto I (Note: For 2 oboes, oboe d'amore, English horn, and heckelphone)	1994	10'	Donemus	
Rob du Bois	Chansons pour appâter les chéiroptères (Note: For oboe, 2 oboe d'amores, and 2 English horns)	1975	8'	Donemus	
Théodore Dubois	Oboe Quintet in F major (Note: For oboe, violin, viola, cello, and piano.))	1905	28'	Silvertrust	ATMA Classique
Anton Eberl	Quintuor Brillant in C, Op. 48 (Note: Published posthumously in 1808, but thought to be an early work)	1790	23'		CPO
David Froom	Quintet for Oboe, Strings and Piano	1991	17'		Arabesque
Peter Golub	Quintet for Oboe, String Trio and Piano	2010			
Franz Anton Hoffmeister	6 Notturnos (Quintets) (Note: For oboe, violin, two violas, and horn or bassoon.)	1780	14' to 22'		Tudor Records
Sergei Prokofiev	Quintet in G minor, Op. 39 (Note: For oboe, clarinet, violin, viola and double bass)	1923	20'		Delos; Capriccio; Cambria
Johann Samuel Schroeter	Quintet 1 in C (Note: For oboe, violin, viola, cello, and clavichord)	1780			

== See also ==
- Oboe quartet

== Sources ==
- Oboe Quintets at all music.com
- Oboe Quintets at the Petrucci Music Library
