= A Trip to Bath =

Unpublished 1765 comedy play

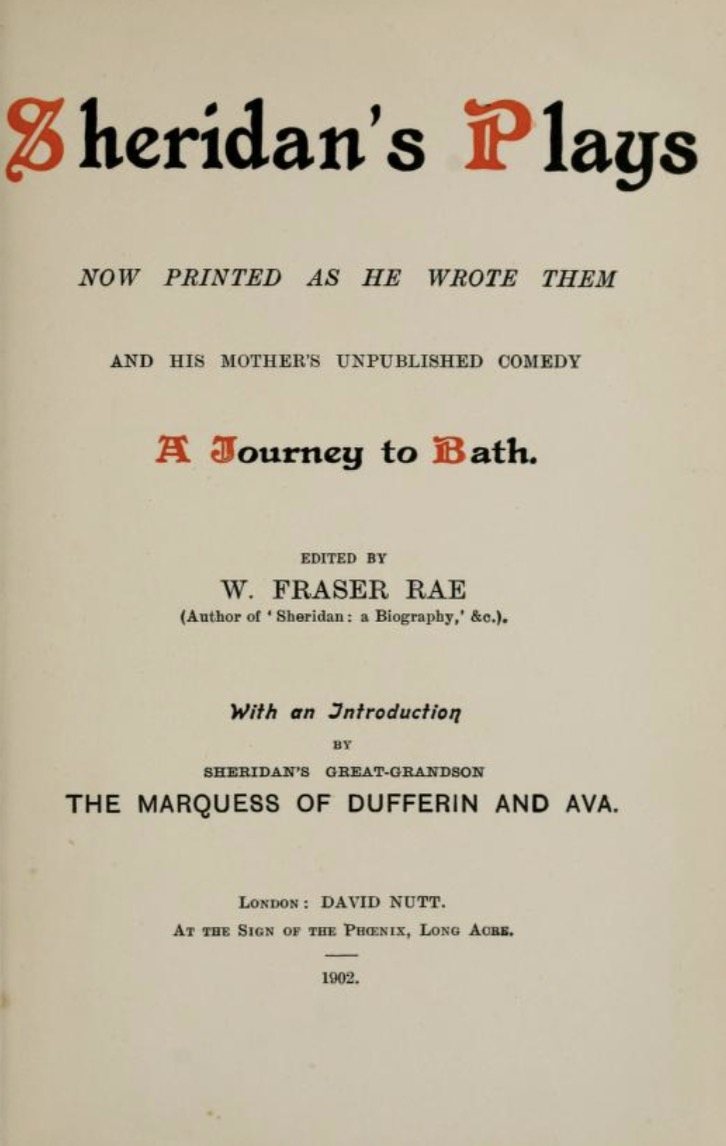
- Title page of Sheridan's Plays, 1902 reprint
- Original language: English
- Written by: Frances Sheridan
- Characters: Lord Stewkly, Sir Jeremy Bull, Sir Jonathan Bull, Edward (son to Sir Jonathan), Champignion, Stapleton, Lady Filmot, Lady Bell Aircastle, Mrs. Tryfort, Lucy (her daughter), Mrs. Surface
- Genre: Comedy
- Setting: Bath, Somerset

A Trip to Bath, also known as A Journey to Bath, is an unpublished 1765 comedy play by the Irish writer Frances Sheridan. The play follows the misadventures of two aristocratic but poor middle-aged characters, Lady Filmot and Lord Stewkly, who are trying to marry two much younger middle class characters, Ms. Lucy Tryfort and Edward Bull, for their money. It survives only in a fragment and was never produced. Sheridan was the mother of the playwright Richard Brinsley Sheridan, who took the narrative quirks of the character of Mrs. Tryfort and applied them in his character Mrs. Malaprop in The Rivals.
