= Elizabeth Maconchy =

Irish composer (1907–1994)

Dame Elizabeth Maconchy DBE
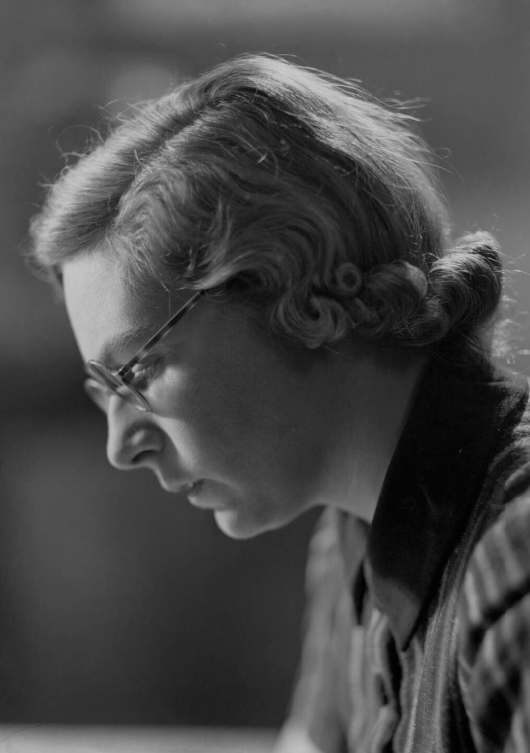
- in 1938 by Howard Coster
- Born: Elizabeth Violet Maconchy; 19 March 1907; Broxbourne, England
- Died: 11 November 1994 (aged 87); Norwich, England
- Education: Royal College of Music
- Occupation: composer
- Spouse: William LeFanu
- Children: 2, including Nicola LeFanu

Dame Elizabeth Violet Maconchy LeFanu DBE (/məˈkɒŋkiː ˈlɛfænuː/; 19 March 1907 – 11 November 1994) was an English-Irish composer. She is considered to be one of the finest composers Great Britain and Ireland have produced.

== Biography ==
Elizabeth Violet Maconchy was born in Broxbourne, Hertfordshire, of Irish parents and grew up in England and Ireland. Her family moved to Ireland in 1917, where they lived in Howth, on the east coast. The adolescent Maconchy began her musical studies in Dublin, studying piano with Edith Boxhill, and harmony and counterpoint with John Francis Larchet. Those formative years in Ireland were important for Maconchy who considered herself Irish. Throughout her career she was identified as an Irish composer, or as an English composer with Irish influences, by reviewers and commentators.

In 1923, at the age of sixteen, she moved to London to enrol at the Royal College of Music. At the RCM Maconchy studied under Charles Wood and Ralph Vaughan Williams. Her contemporaries at the college included Grace Williams, Dorothy Gow, and Ina Boyle. Early compositions such as the violin sonata and Piano Concertino of 1927 already show the influence of European composers, especially Béla Bartók. As a student, Maconchy was awarded the Blumenthal Scholarship in 1927, and the Octavia Scholarship of 1930, which allowed her to continue her studies in Prague. Her first public recognition came on 19 March 1930 with a performance of her Piano Concerto, conducted by her teacher there, Karel Jirak. This was followed on 30 August by a BBC Proms performance of her cantata The Land, conducted by Henry Wood, which was inspired by the long poem of the same name by Vita Sackville-West.

In response to the scarce opportunities for young avant garde composers and for female composers, a group of women got together to organise regular concerts at the small Ballet Club theatre in Notting Hill, London, showcasing new work. It has been claimed that this venture "changed the face of music in London", and that it "prove[d] a lifeline for Elizabeth Maconchy through the 1930s".

In 1930 Maconchy married William LeFanu, with whom she had two daughters: Elizabeth Anna LeFanu (born 1939, aka Anna Dunlop) and Nicola LeFanu (born 1947). In 1932, Maconchy developed tuberculosis and she moved with her family from London to Kent. She returned to Ireland in 1939, living in Dublin for a brief period, during which she composed her Fifth String Quartet, which some critics consider her greatest achievement, and gave birth to a daughter.

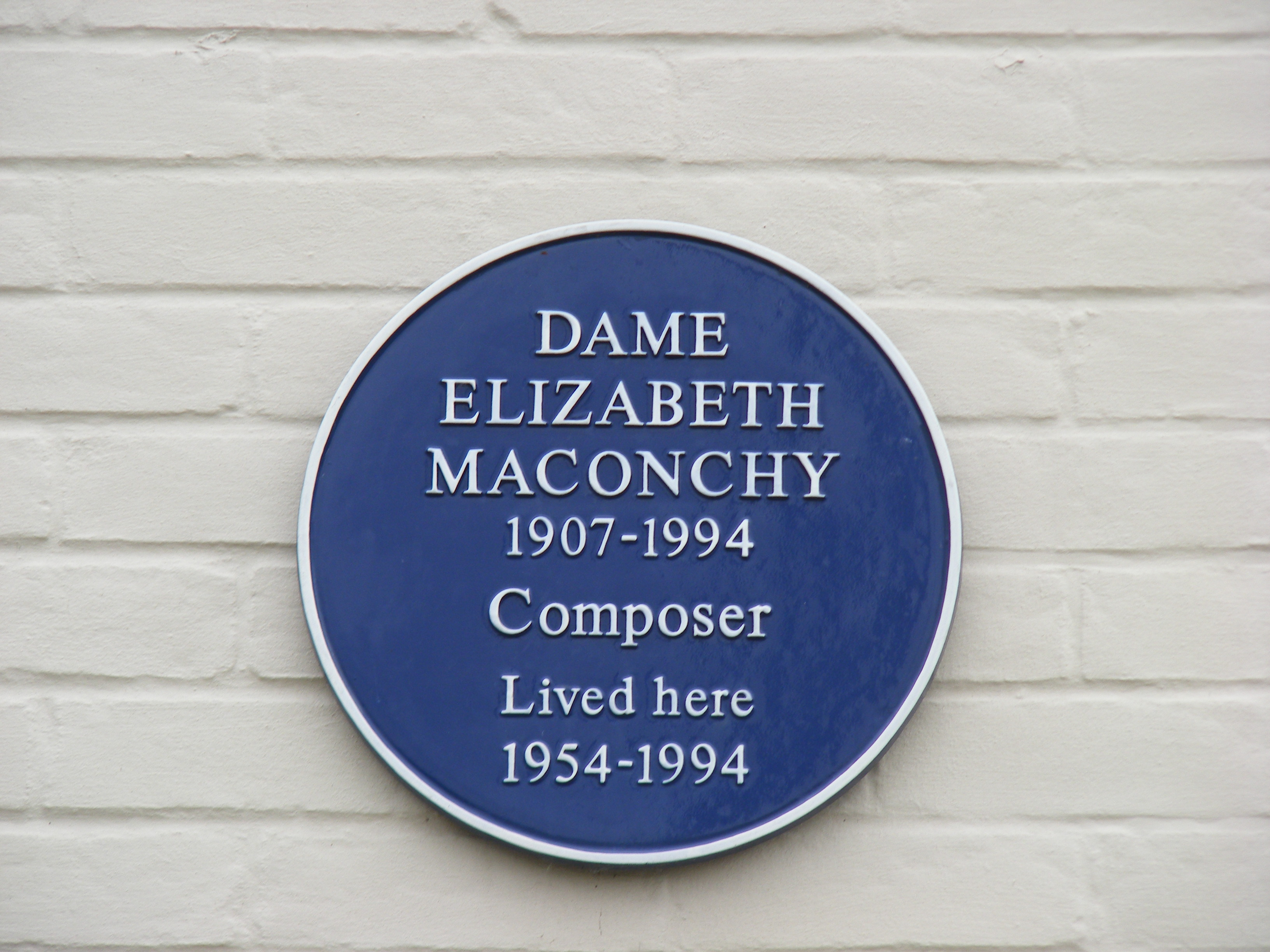
Elizabeth Maconchy's plaque in Shottesbrook, Boreham

Maconchy did much to improve the conditions of composers, being elected Chair of the Composers Guild of Great Britain in 1959, a position she held for a number of years. She was also President of the Society for the Promotion of New Music. Maconchy was a socialist, and her activism extended to supporting the Democratic/Republican side in the Spanish Civil War, and other causes.

Maconchy's friends included the English composers Ralph Vaughan Williams and Elisabeth Lutyens, the Welsh composer Grace Williams, the Irish composer Ina Boyle, and the Czech music critic Jan Löwenbach.

She died in Norwich, England.

== Compositions ==
Maconchy is considered to be "one of the finest composers the British Isles have produced". Her work has been compared to that of Bartók, who was an acknowledged influence, and also to Beethoven and Mozart, as well as (favourably) to contemporaries such as Benjamin Britten. She produced over 200 works. According to Ailie Blunnie, Maconchy was "a gestural composer, concerning herself with short musical fragments, as opposed to large-scale concepts or templates", at least in part because of her "ideology" as a composer, so that "she never planned anything out, musically speaking, in any great detail in advance of composition, [and by using shorter formats] she could afford to explore the possibilities implicit in the ideas themselves as they arose".

In terms of style, Maconchy had "a predilection for intervallic composition", and, "profoundly influenced by the resonances produced by certain intervals, [she] tended to build works around one or a small number of intervals, which varied according to the work in question". A favoured "harmonic device" was the "simultaneous use of major and minor sonorities", which "came to denote episodes of heightened emotion". It has been argued that her work is often "driven by rhythm", which gives it its characteristic confluence of "energy, dynamism and imagination".

Maconchy's cycle of thirteen string quartets, composed between 1932 and 1983, is regarded as the peak of her musical achievements. Historian of music Anna Beer has contended, paraphrasing the composer herself, that "Maconchy loved the quartet form because it represented a debate, a dialectic between four balanced, individual, impassioned voices." She once declared that: "for me, the best music is an impassioned argument".

She also wrote for voice. Maconchy wrote three one-act operas, including the erotic comic opera The Sofa, based on an eighteenth century novel, and stylistically in "dialogue with Mozart", which shocked the audience for its explicitness when it premiered in 1959. In 1943 she responded to war with The Voice of the City, for women's chorus, about the Battle of Stalingrad. There were many songs written throughout her career, but most of them were unpublished and remained little known. In 1981 she set to music prose versions of some Petrarchan sonnets, by the Irish writer J.M. Synge, grouped together as a song cycle, My Dark Heart. Life Story for strings was one of her last major compositions, premiered just before her eightieth birthday. Uncompromisingly modernistic, it is dominated by its central slow movement. Leah Broad describes it as "fiendishly difficult".

=== String quartets ===
- No. 1 (1932/33)
- No. 2 (1936)
- No. 3 (1938)
- No. 4 (1942/43)
- No. 5 (1948)
- No. 6 (1950)
- No. 7 (1955)
- No. 8 (1967)
- No. 9 (1968)
- No. 10 (1972)
- No. 11 (1976)
- No. 12 (1979)
- No. 13 Quartetto Corto (1982–83)

=== Symphonic ===
- Suite in E minor for string orchestra (1924)
- Fantasy for flute, harp and string orchestra (1926, lost)
- Elegy for flute, horn and string orchestra (1926, lost)
- Fantasy for Children for small orchestra (1927–28)
- Theme and Variations for orchestra (1928)
- The Land, symphonic suite after V. Sackville-West's poem, for orchestra (1929)
- Symphony (No. 1), for orchestra (1929–30, withdrawn)
- Suite for chamber orchestra (1930, withdrawn)
- Comedy Overture for orchestra (1932–33)
- Two Dances from the ballet Puck Fair, for orchestra (1940)
- Variations on a Well-Known Theme, for orchestra (1942)
- Theme and Variations for string orchestra (1942–43)
- Suite from the ballet Puck Fair, for orchestra (1943)
- Symphony (No. 2), for orchestra (1945–48, withdrawn)
- Nocturne for orchestra (1950–51)
- Proud Thames : Coronation Overture, for orchestra (1952–53)
- Symphony for double string orchestra (1952–53)
- Suite on Irish Airs, for small orchestra (1953; arr. for full orch, 1954)
- Suite on Irish Airs, version for full orchestra (1955)
- A Country Town, 6 short pieces for orchestra (c. 1956) [arr. of piano pieces from 1939]
- Music for Woodwinds and Brass (1965–66)
- An Essex Overture, for orchestra (1966)
- Three Cloudscapes for orchestra (1968, withdrawn)
- Genesis for chamber orchestra (1972–73)
- Sinfonietta, for orchestra (1976)
- Little Symphony, for orchestra (1980–81)
- Music for Strings (1981–82)
- Life Story, for string orchestra (1985)

=== Concertante ===
- Andante and Allegro, for flute and string orchestra (1926–27)
- Concertino (No. 1) for piano and chamber orchestra (1928; rev. 1929–30)
- Viola Concerto (1937, withdrawn)
- Dialogue for piano and orchestra (1940–41)
- Concertino (No. 1) for clarinet and string orchestra (1945)
- Concertino (No. 2) for piano and string orchestra (1949)
- Concertino for bassoon and string orchestra (1950)
- Toombeola, for violin and string orchestra (1954, withdrawn)
- Concerto for oboe, bassoon and string orchestra (1955–56)
- Suite for oboe and string orchestra (1955–56)
- Serenata concertante for violin and orchestra (1962)
- Variazioni concertante, for oboe, clarinet, bassoon, horn and string orchestra (1964–65)
- Epyllion, for solo cello and 15 strings (1973–75)
- Romanza for viola, woodwind quintet and string quintet (or viola and piano) (1979)
- Tribute, for violin and woodwind octet (1982)
- Concertino (No. 2) for clarinet and small orchestra (1984)

=== Chamber and instrumental ===
- Duo (Theme and Variations) (1951)
- Notebook for harpsichord (1965–6)
- Three Pieces for harp (1976)
- Contemplation for cello and piano (1978)
- Piccola Musica for violin, viola and cello (1981)
- Trittico, for two oboes, bassoon and harpsichord (1981)
- Wind Quintet (1982)

=== Stage ===
- Great Agrippa, ballet (1933)
- Puck Fair, ballet, libretto: F. R. Higgins, (1939–40)
- The Sofa, comic opera, libretto: Ursula Vaughan Williams, (1956–57)
- The Three Strangers, opera, libretto: Elizabeth Maconchy after Thomas Hardy, (1957–58, rev. 1967, −69, −77)
- The Departure, opera, libretto: Anne Ridler, (1960–61, rev. 1977)
- The Birds, extravaganza, Elizabeth Maconchy after Aristophanes, (1967–68)
- Johnny and the Mohawks, children's opera (1969)
- The Jesse Tree, masque, libretto: Anne Ridler, (1969–70)
- The King of the Golden River, children's opera, libretto: Elizabeth Maconchy after John Ruskin (1975)

=== Choral ===
- Hymn to God the Father for mixed double choir, text John Donne (1931)
- The Voice of the City for female chorus and piano, text Jacqueline Morris (1943)
- Nocturnal, three poems for mixed chorus and piano (1965, Cork Festival 1966)
- Samson and the Gates of Gaza, cantata for chorus and orchestra, text Vachel Lindsay (1963–4)
- And Death Shall Have No Dominion, chorus and ensemble, text Dylan Thomas (1969)
- Prayer before Birth for female chorus and piano, text Louis MacNeice (1972)
- Siren's Song, a cappella chorus, text William Browne (1974)
- Two Epitaphs for female chorus (1975)
- Four Miniatures for mixed chorus, text Eleanor Farjeon (1978)
- Héloïse and Abelard for soloists, chorus and orchestra (1978)
- Creatures, cycle for mixed chorus (1979)
- Still Falls the Rain for mixed double choir, text Edith Sitwell (1985)
- On Stephenses Day for female chorus (1989)

=== Songs ===
- Impetuous Heart, Be Still, text Yeats (1924)
- Ophelia’s Song, text William Shakespeare (1926)
- The Poet-Wooer, text Ben Jonson (1928)
- The Cloths of Heaven, text W. B. Yeats (1929)
- In a Fountain Court, text Arthur Symons (1929)
- The Woodspurge (1930), text Dante Gabriel Rossetti (1930)
- The Thrush, text John Keats (1934)
- The Garland: Variations on a Theme, cycle of seven songs, text after Anacreon, tr. William Le Fanu (1937)
  - 'The Garland'
  - 'Old and Young'
  - 'I Would I Were a Mirror'
  - 'No End to Love'
  - 'The Swallow'
  - 'Love Stood at My Door'
  - 'The Bee-Sting'
- Sleep Brings No Joy to Me, text Emily Brontë (1937)
- Sailor’s Song of the Two Balconies, text Sheila Wingfield (1941)
- The Disillusion, text Sheila Wingfield (1941)
- The Exequy, text Henry King (1956)
- Three Settings of Poems by Gerard Manley Hopkins for high voice and chamber orchestra (1964–70)
- Four Shakespeare Songs (1965)
- Ariadne, soprano and orchestra, text Cecil Day-Lewis (1970)
- Faustus, dramatic scena for tenor and piano, text Christopher Marlowe (1971)
- Three Songs for tenor and harp, texts Byron, Shelley, Campbell (1974)
- Sun, Moon and Stars, for soprano and piano, text Thomas Traherne (1974)
- My Dark Heart, song cycle for soprano and chamber ensemble, text J. M. Synge (1981)
- L'Horloge, for soprano, clarinet and piano, text Baudelaire (1983)

== Honours ==
In 1933, Maconchy's quintet for oboe and strings won The Daily Telegraph Chamber Music Competition, and was recorded by Helen Gaskel with the Griller Quartet soon afterwards on His Master's Voice. In 1948, she was awarded the Edwin Evans Prize for her String Quartet No. 5. In 1953, her "Proud Thames" overture won the London County Council Competition as Coronation Overture for the new Queen of the United Kingdom.

In 1959, Maconchy was invited to chair the Composers' Guild of Great Britain, the first woman to do so. In 1960, she was awarded the Cobbett Medal for chamber music. In 1976, following the death of Benjamin Britten, she became President of the Society for the Promotion of New Music. She was made a Commander of the Order of the British Empire (CBE) in 1977, and elevated to Dame Commander (DBE) in 1987.

During the week of May 13–17, 2024, Maconchy was featured as Composer of the Week on BBC Radio 3.
