= List of compositions by Vagn Holmboe =

This is a sortable list of compositions by Vagn Holmboe (1909–1996). The works are categorized by the M. number (for Meta) from Paul Rapoport's catalogue where known, and by the opus number assigned by the composer where applicable. Title, date of composition and genre are also provided.

== List ==
M.	Op.	Title	Date	Genre	Remarks
		Violin sonata	1924	Chamber	
1		Duo for 2 violins	1926	Chamber	
2		Trio	1926	Chamber	For 3 violins, or flute and 2 violins.
3		String quartet 'a', in C minor	1926	Chamber (string quartet)	
4		String quartet 'b', in E minor	1927	Chamber (string quartet)	
5		Nocturne	1927	Vocal	With string quartet accompaniment.
6		Symphony 'a', in F minor, Sinfonia Utopia	1927	Orchestral (symphony)	
7		Scherzo	1928	Piano	
8		Piece for 3 violins	1928	Chamber	
9		String quartet 'c', in C minor	1928	Chamber (string quartet)	Incomplete.
10		Symphony 'b', in D minor	1928	Orchestral (symphony)	Incomplete.
11		Bagatelle No. 1, Arabesque	1928	Chamber	For violin and piano. There are no further 'bagatelles'.
12		Stjerner (Stars)	1928	Vocal	
13		String quintet in E♭ major	1928	Chamber	A 'viola' quintet.
14		12 little pieces for piano	1928-29	Piano	
15		Molto allegro scherzando, for solo violin	1929	Solo Instrument	
16		Chorale fantasy in E minor	1929	Piano	
17		String quartet 'd', in D minor	1929	Chamber (string quartet)	
18		String quartet 'e'	1929-30	Chamber (string quartet)	
19		Piano sonata 'a'	1929	Piano	
20		Violin sonata 'a'	1929	Chamber	
21		Concerto for Orchestra	1929	Concerto	
22		Prelude	1930	Piano	A variant of this piece is a movement in M. 23.
23		Piano suite 'a'	1930	Piano	
24		String trio 'a'	1930	Chamber	
25		Piano sonata 'b'	1930	Piano	
26		4 pieces for piano	1930	Piano	2nd half of a collection of children's pieces.
27		Quintet	1930	Chamber	Incomplete. Scoring unknown.
28		Quartet	1930	Chamber	For flute, oboe, viola and cello.
29		String quartet 'f'	1930	Chamber (string quartet)	
30		Symphony for piano	1930	Piano	
31		Klaverstykker for børn (Piano pieces for children)	1930	Piano	1st half of a collection of children's pieces.
31a		Nocturne	1930	Piano	
32		1- and 2-part piano pieces	1930	Piano	
33		Allegro affetuoso	1931	Piano	
34		Little pieces	1931		Scoring unknown, probably piano or recorders.
35		Requiem	1931	Choral	For children's choir and chamber orchestra.
36		Amatørklaver I (Amateur piano I)	1931	Piano	Part of a collection of suites and dances.
37		Duets for recorder	1931	Chamber	
38		Piano pieces	1931	Piano	
39		1-, 2- and 3-part piano pieces	1931	Piano	
40		3 songs for children's choir	1931	Choral (unaccompanied)	
41		Concerto, for chamber orchestra	1931	Concerto	
42		Allegro sostenuto for violin and piano	1931	Chamber	
43		String trio 'b'	1931	Chamber	
44		Provinsen (The Provinces)	1931	Choral	Accompaniment is flute, oboe, violin and cello.
45		Christmas 1931	1931	Piano	
46		String trio 'c'	1931	Chamber	
47		Piano suite 'b'	1931	Piano	Part of a collection of suites and dances.
48		Concerto for piano	1931	Piano	
49		Chamber Music No. 1	1931	Orchestral	For chamber orchestra.
50		2 Danish peasant dances / 2 Folk songs from Jutland / Dance in 5/8 time	1931	Piano	Part of a collection of suites and dances.
51		7 preludes	1932	Piano	
52		String quartet 'g'	1932	Chamber (string quartet)	
53		5 Duets for flute and viola	1932	Chamber	
54		Trio	1932	Chamber	Completed in 1939. For oboe, French horn and bassoon.
55		Chamber Music No. 2	1932	Orchestral	For strings. Incorporated into M. 72.
56		Capriccio for piano	1932	Piano	
57		Suite for chamber orchestra	1932	Orchestral	Revised 1932–33. Incorporated into M. 72 and M. 73.
58		Overture 'a'	1932	Orchestral	For chamber orchestra.
59		Overture 'b'	1932	Orchestral	First version for full orchestra. Revised version for strings.
60		7 Duos for flute and violin	1932	Chamber	
61		4 Duos for flute and cello	1932	Chamber	
62		String trio 'd'	1932	Chamber	Also a version for flute, clarinet and bassoon.
63		Music I for School Orchestra	1932	Orchestral	For strings.
64		Chamber Music No. 3	1932	Percussion	
65		Weg in Dezember (Away in December)	1933	Vocal	
66		Amatørklaver II (Amateur piano II)	1933	Piano	Revision of M. 36.
67		Piano suite 'c'	1933	Piano	
68		String quartet 'h'	1933	Chamber (string quartet)	
69		Divertimento No. 1	1933	Orchestral	For chamber orchestra.
70		Wind quintet	1933	Chamber	
71		Divertimento No. 3	1933	Chamber	For 2 oboes, 2 trumpets and 2 trombones.
72		Divertimento No. 2	1933	Orchestral	Revised 1976. For strings.
73		Concerto, for strings	1933	Concerto	
74		Symphony 'c'	1933	Orchestral (symphony)	Incomplete.
75		De danske tålte ikke tvang (The Danes Would Not Stand Coercion)	1934	Choral (unaccompanied)	
76		6 Sketches	1934	Piano	
77		Chamber Music No. 4	1934	Chamber	For oboe, violin and cello. Incorporated into M. 90.
78		10 Romanian Dances	1934	Piano	
79	1	Suite No. 1 for chamber orchestra	1935	Orchestral	
80		Overture 'c'	1935	Orchestral	
81		2 songs	1935	Vocal	Scoring of accompaniment is unknown.
82	2a	Violin Sonata No. 1	1935	Chamber	
83	2b	Chamber Sonata No. 1, for violin and string orchestra	1935	Orchestra with soloist	Orchestral arrangement of M. 82. There are no further 'chamber sonatas'.
84		Serenade	1935	Chamber	For flute, clarinet and bassoon. Incorporated into M. 90.
85	4	Symphony No. 1	1935	Orchestral (symphony)	For chamber orchestra.
86		Romanian Suite for piano and chamber orchestra	1935	Orchestra with soloist	Incorporated into M. 88.
87	5	Rhapsody for flute and chamber orchestra	1935	Orchestra with soloist	
88	6	Suite No. 2 for chamber orchestra	1935-36	Orchestral	
89		Little Overture	1936	Orchestral	For 2 soloists and orchestra. Also a version for flute, violin and piano.
90	3	Serenade	1936	Chamber	For flute, clarinet, violin, viola and cello.
91	7a	3 Lyriske Sang (Lyrical Songs)	1936	Vocal	
92	7b	Stilfaerdige Sange (Quiet Songs)	1936	Vocal	
93		Rhapsody for clarinet and violin	1936	Chamber	Incorporated into M. 104.
94	9	Quartet	1936	Chamber	Revised 1937. For flute, violin, cello and piano.
95		Den dovne trillebør (The Lazy Wheelbarrow)	1936	Choral (unaccompanied)	
96	10	Quintet	1936	Chamber	For flute, oboe, clarinet, violin and viola.
97	11	Suite No. 3 for chamber orchestra	1936	Orchestral	
98		2 Romanian dances	1937	Piano	Incorporated into M. 99.
99	12a	Rumænsk Suite (Romanian Suite)	1937	Piano	
100		New piano pieces	1937	Piano	Incomplete.
101	12b	Dansk Suite (Danish Suite)	1937-38	Piano	
102	13a	Psalm 62	1937	Choral (unaccompanied)	For children's choir.
103	13b	Concerto-Symphony for violin and orchestra	1937	Concerto	Incomplete.
104	8	Rhapsodic Intermezzo for clarinet, violin and piano	1938	Chamber	
105	14	Violin Concerto No. 1	1938	Concerto	
106		Music for Violin Choir	1938	Orchestral	
107	15	Symphony No. 2	1938-39	Orchestral (symphony)	
108		Concertino, for chamber orchestra	1938	Concerto	
109		Rumænsk Suite (Romanian Suite)	1938	Orchestral	Orchestration of M. 99. Incomplete.
110		Dansk Suite (Danish Suite)	1938	Orchestral	Orchestration of M. 101.
111		Klavermusik for børn (Piano music for children)	1938	Piano	
112	16	Violin Sonata No. 2	1939	Chamber	
113	17	(Chamber) Concerto No. 1, for piano	1939	Concerto	
114		6 piano pieces	1939	Piano	
115		Etude	1939	Piano	
116	18	Serenade	1940	Chamber	For flute, violin, cello and piano.
117	23	Fanden og borgmesteren (The Devil and the Mayor)	1940	Stage	Described as a 'symphonic fantasy play'.
118	19	Notturno for wind quintet	1940	Chamber	
119		Cantata No. 1	1940	Choral	Lost.
120	20	(Chamber) Concerto No. 2, for flute and violin	1940	Concerto	
121	21	(Chamber) Concerto No. 3, for clarinet	1940-42	Concerto	Revised 1976.
122		2 songs	1940	Choral (unaccompanied)	
123	22	Concertino No. 1 for violin, viola and string orchestra	1940	Concerto	
124		Jeg har sortnende hede og hvidtnende sande (I have Darkening Heath and Lightening Sands)	1940	Choral (unaccompanied)	
125	24	Concertino No. 2 for violin and string orchestra	1940	Concerto	Lost.
126	25	Symphony No. 3, Sinfonia Rustica	1941	Orchestral (symphony)	
127		3-voice Canons (first set)	1941	Choral (unaccompanied)	
128		3-voice Canons (second set)	1941	Choral (unaccompanied)	
129	26	String quartet 'i'	1941	Chamber (string quartet)	Further work 1944 and 1949. Possibly incomplete. Not part of numbered quartet series, despite being assigned opus number.
130	27a	Sonatina briosa	1941	Piano	
131	28	Symphonic Overture	1941	Orchestral	
132	29	Symphony No. 4, Sinfonia Sacra	1941	Orchestral (symphony)	Revised 1945. Includes choral part.
133		Cantata No. 2	1941	Choral	Written for the 200th anniversary of the death of Vitus Bering.
134	32a	Den galsindede tyrk (The Ill-Tempered Turk)	1942-44	Ballet	Orchestral suite from this work is M. 242.
135	27b	Sonatina capricciosa	1942	Chamber	For flute and piano.
136		5 Epigrams	1942	Piano	
137		Cantata No. 3	1942	Choral	Written for the 500th anniversary of Horsens.
138		Cantata No. 4	1942/45	Choral	Lost.
139	30	(Chamber) Concerto No. 4, for piano trio	1942	Concerto	
140		2 songs	1942	Vocal	
141	31	(Chamber) Concerto No. 5, for viola	1943	Concerto	
142	36	Jeg ved en urt så dejlig og bold (I Know a Plant so Lovely and Fine)	1943	Choral (unaccompanied)	
143	33	(Chamber) Concerto No. 6, for violin	1943	Concerto	
144	34	5 Lagerkvist Songs	1943/47	Choral (unaccompanied)	No. 1 is for men's chorus, others are for mixed chorus.
145	35	Symphony No. 5	1944	Orchestral (symphony)	
146		String quartet 'j'	1944	Chamber (string quartet)	Probably incomplete.
147	37	(Chamber) Concerto No. 7, for oboe	1944-45	Concerto	
148	38	(Chamber) Concerto No. 8, Sinfonia Concertante	1945	Concerto	
149	39	(Chamber) Concerto No. 9, for violin and viola	1945-46	Concerto	
150	40	(Chamber) Concerto No. 10, Træ-messing-tarm (Wood-Brass-Gut)	1945-46	Concerto	
151	41	Rosette (Sonatina)	1946	Vocal	Duet. Revised 1980.
152		Cantata No. 5, Århundredstjernen (The Centenary Star)	1946	Choral	
153		Lave og Jon (Lave and Jon)	1946-48	Opera	
154	42	Music for radio play Fløjten (The Flute)	1946	Incidental music	Lost.
155	43	Symphony No. 6	1947	Orchestral (symphony)	
156		Cantata No. 6	1947	Choral	Lost.
157	44	(Chamber) Concerto No. 11, for trumpet	1948	Concerto	
158		Ikke forlig (No Compromise)	1948	Choral (unaccompanied)	
159	46	String Quartet No. 1	1948-49	Chamber (string quartet)	
160	45a	12 Danske skaemteviser (Danish Jesting Ballads)	1948	Vocal	
161	47	String Quartet No. 2	1949	Chamber (string quartet)	
162	45b	Træer og vaekster (Trees and Plants)	1949	Vocal	
163	45c	Bjergenes sang (Song of the Mountains)	1949-52	Vocal	Revised 1991.
164		Cantata No. 7	1949	Choral	Written for the 50th anniversary of the Danish Nursing Council.
165	48	String Quartet No. 3	1949-50	Chamber (string quartet)	
166	49	Suono da bardo	1949-50	Piano	
167	50	Symphony No. 7	1950	Orchestral (symphony)	In one movement.
168	51	Isomeric (Duo Concertante)	1950	Chamber	For 2 violins and piano.
169	52	(Chamber) Concerto No. 12, for trombone	1950	Concerto	
170		Cantata No. 8	1950	Choral	Lost.
171	53	Chamber symphony No. 1	1951	Orchestral	
172	54	Liber Canticorum Book I	1951	Choral (unaccompanied)	
173		Film score, J. F. Willumsen	1951	Incidental music	Film about the Danish artist. The written score is missing.
174	55	Primavera (Spring)	1951	Chamber	For flute, violin, cello and piano.
175	56	Symphony No. 8, Sinfonia Boreale	1951-52	Orchestral (symphony)	
176	57	Moya (Mist) (7 Japanese Songs)	1952	Vocal	
177	58	Sendebude (Messengers)	1952	Vocal	
178	59	Liber Canticorum Book II	1952-53	Choral (unaccompanied)	
179	60	Liber Canticorum Book III	1953	Choral (unaccompanied)	
180	61	Liber Canticorum Book IV	1953	Choral (unaccompanied)	
181	62	Træet (The Tree)	1953	Choral	With orchestra.
182		Solo Violin Sonata	1953	Solo Instrument	Incomplete. Incorporated into M. 183.
183	63	String Quartet No. 4	1953-54	Chamber (string quartet)	Revised 1956.
184	64	Piano Trio	1954	Chamber	
185	65	Sinfonia in memoriam	1954-55	Orchestral (symphonic metamorphosis)	Originally presented as "Symphony No. 9".
186		Cantata No. 9	1955	Choral	Written for Randers Central Hospital.
187	67	(Chamber) Concerto No. 13, for oboe and viola	1955-56	Concerto	
188	66	String Quartet No. 5	1955	Chamber (string quartet)	
189	68	Epitaph	1956	Orchestral (symphonic metamorphosis)	
190	69	3 Inuit Songs (1st set)	1956	Choral	For baritone, chorus and timpani.
191	70	Quartetto medico	1956	Chamber	For flute, oboe, clarinet and piano.
192	71	Solo Flute Sonata	1957	Solo Instrument	
193	72	Aspekter (Aspects) for wind quintet	1957	Chamber	
194	73a	Sinfonia I	1957	Orchestral	The four parts of Op. 73 can be played separately or combined into a single work, Kairos.
195		Cantata No. 10	1957	Choral	Lost.
196	73b	Sinfonia II	1957	Orchestral	Part of Kairos - see M. 194.
197		Concertino for 4 recorders and string orchestra	1957	Concerto	
198		Cantata No. 11	1958	Choral	Lost. For the Royal Veterinary and Agricultural College's 100th anniversary.
199		Simeons lovsång (Simeon's Song of Praise)	1958	Choral (unaccompanied)	
200	73c	Sinfonia III	1958-59	Orchestral	Part of Kairos - see M. 194.
201		Cantata No. 12	1958-59	Choral	For Aarhus University's anniversary.
202		3 songs	1959	Choral (unaccompanied)	
203		Music for Gnavpotten (The Grouch)	1959	Incidental music	Lost.
204		Kniven (The Knife)	1959-60	Opera	Full score missing, but vocal score extant.
205	74	Skoven (The Forest)	1960	Choral	With orchestra.
206	75	Tropos for string quintet	1960	Chamber	A 'viola' quintet.
207	76	Monolith	1960	Orchestral (symphonic metamorphosis)	
208	77	Solhymne (Hymn to the Sun)	1960	Choral (unaccompanied)	Text by Akhenaten.
209		3 songs	1960	Choral	With piano accompaniment.
210	78	String Quartet No. 6	1961	Chamber (string quartet)	
211		5 Børnesange (Children's Songs)	1961	Choral (unaccompanied)	
212	79	Brass Quintet No. 1	1961-62	Chamber	
213	80	Epilog	1961-62	Orchestral (symphonic metamorphosis)	Originally presented as "Symphony No. 9".
214	81	Hevjið í homrum (Raise in the Passes)	1962/64	Choral (unaccompanied)	
215	73d	Sinfonia IV	1962	Orchestral	Part of Kairos - see M. 194.
216	82	Solo Double Bass Sonata	1962	Solo Instrument	
217		Glemselshejren (The Heron of Oblivion)	1963	Choral (unaccompanied)	For men's chorus.
218	83	Duo Concertante for violin and viola	1963	Chamber	Revised 1977.
219	84	Requiem for Nietzsche	1963-64	Choral	With orchestra.
220		Music for Julius Caesar	1963	Incidental music	Lost.
221		Evangeliespråk (Gospel Sayings)	1964	Choral (unaccompanied)	
222		Sinfonia Zieleriana	1964	Orchestral	Incomplete.
223	85	Sange mod vårdybet/Sól og kavi (Songs towards the Deep of Spring/Sun and Snow)	1964-65	Choral (unaccompanied)	Revised 1968.
224	86	String Quartet No. 7	1964-65	Chamber (string quartet)	
225	87	String Quartet No. 8	1965	Chamber (string quartet)	
226	88a	Moto austero	1965	Piano	
227	89	Violin Sonata No. 3	1965	Chamber	
228	92	String Quartet No. 9	1965-66	Chamber (string quartet)	Revised 1969.
229	90	Quartet	1966	Chamber	For flute, violin, viola and cello.
230	91	Kibkariuk (2nd set of Inuit Songs)	1966	Vocal	For alto, clarinet and 3 drums.
231	93a	Sonatina for oboe and piano	1966	Chamber	
232	98	3 Jaeger Songs	1966/68	Choral (unaccompanied)	
233	94	Zeit	1966-67	Vocal	With string quartet accompaniment.
234		En tosset verden (A Crazy World)	1966	Choral	For children's choir.
235	95	Symphony No. 9	1967-68	Orchestral (symphony)	Revised 1969.
236	96a	Liber Canticorum Book V - Beatus Vir	1967	Choral (unaccompanied)	
237		De vilde hvide/Nikke nikke nambo	1968	Choral	For children's choir.
238	97	Trio	1968	Chamber	For flute, cello and piano.
239	99a	I Venti (The Winds)	1968	Piano	
240	100	Chamber symphony No. 2, Elegy	1968	Orchestral	
241	101	Solo Cello Sonata	1968-69	Solo Instrument	
242	32b	Suite from Den galsindede tyrk (The Ill-Tempered Turk)	1969	Orchestral	Taken from M. 134.
243	102	String Quartet No. 10	1969	Chamber (string quartet)	
244		Film score, Multityder (Multitudes)	1969	Incidental music	
245		5 Späte Lieder (Late Songs)	1969	Vocal	
246	103a	Chamber symphony No. 3, Frise (Frieze)	1969-70	Orchestral	
247		Solsort (Blackbird)	1970	Choral (unaccompanied)	
248	103b	Cantata Profana 'Frise' (Frieze)	1970	Choral (unaccompanied)	Arrangement of M. 246.
249	104	Musik til Morten (Music for Morten), for oboe quintet	1970	Chamber	
250	105	Symphony No. 10	1970-71	Orchestral (symphony)	Revised 1972.
251	106a	Fanden løs i vildmosen (The Devil to Pay in the Marsh)	1971	Chamber	For clarinet, 2 violins and double bass.
252	106b	Musik for fugle og frøer (Music for Birds and Frogs)	1971	Chamber	For 2 flutes and 16 bassoons. Alternative version for 2 flutes, bassoon and viola.
253	107a	Edward (traditional border ballad)	1971	Vocal	With chamber orchestra.
254	108	Tempo variabile	1971-72	Orchestral (symphonic metamorphosis)	
255	107b	The Wee Wee Man (traditional border ballad)	1971	Vocal	With chamber orchestra.
256	109a	Ondata I (Waves I)	1972	Percussion	
257	88b	Moto austero	1972	Piano	Revision of M. 226.
258	99b	I Venti (The Winds)	1972	Piano	Revision of M. 239.
259	110a	2 Border Ballads No. 1 - A Lyke-Wake Dirge	1972	Choral (unaccompanied)	
260	110b	2 Border Ballads No. 2 - The Wee Wee Man	1972	Choral (unaccompanied)	
261		Cantata No. 13	1972	Choral (unaccompanied)	For Vrå College's 100th anniversary.
262	111	String Quartet No. 11, Quartetto Rustico	1972	Chamber (string quartet)	
263		Hyld (Elder Tree)	1972	Choral (unaccompanied)	
264		2 songs	1972	Choral (unaccompanied)	
265	112	Fabula I (Fable I)	1972	Organ	
266	113	Contrasti	1972	Organ	
267	114	Sextet	1972-73	Chamber	For flute, clarinet, bassoon, violin, viola and cello.
268	115	Fabula II (Fable II)	1973	Organ	
269	116	String Quartet No. 12	1973	Chamber (string quartet)	
270	117	Beatus Parvo	1973	Choral	With orchestra.
271	118	Diafora (Differences)	1973-74	Orchestral	For strings.
272	119	Eydna/Lykken (Good Fortune)	1974	Choral (unaccompanied)	
273	120	Cello Concerto	1974	Concerto	Revised 1979.
274	121	Fanfare for 3 trumpets and timpani	1974	Chamber	
275	122	Recorder Concerto	1974	Concerto	
276	123	Triade	1974-75	Chamber	For trumpet and organ.
277	124	String Quartet No. 13	1975	Chamber (string quartet)	
278	125	String Quartet No. 14	1975	Chamber (string quartet)	
279	126	Flute Concerto No. 1	1975-76	Concerto	
280	127	Tuba Concerto	1976	Concerto	
281	128	Døgnets timer (The Hours of the Day)	1976	Chamber (string quartet)	Further work 1978 and 1979 but incomplete. Revised material included in String Quartets 17 to 20.
282		March	1976	Brass	
283	129	Nuigen (Now-again), for piano trio	1976	Chamber	
284		3 Motets	1976	Choral	With organ accompaniment.
285	130	Firefir	1976-77	Chamber	For 4 flutes (including 1 alto and 1 bass).
286	131	Louisiana Concerto for strings	1977	Concerto	
287		Fanfare 77	1977	Orchestral	Composed for Queen Elizabeth II's Silver Jubilee.
288	132	Concerto giocondo e severo	1977	Concerto	
289	133	Trio	1977	Chamber	For recorder, cello and harpsichord. Alternatively for flute, cello and piano.
290	134	Ordet (The Word)	1977	Choral	With brass and organ accompaniment. Text from the Bible.
291	135	String Quartet No. 15	1977-78	Chamber (string quartet)	
292	109b	Ondata II (Waves II)	1978	Percussion	
292a		Klokkeglassets vise (The Bell Glass's Song)	1978	Vocal	
293	136	Brass Quintet No. 2	1978	Chamber	
294	137	Trio	1978	Chamber	For clarinet, cello and piano.
295	138a	Þótt form þín hjúpi graflín (Although a Shroud Covers your Form)	1978	Choral (unaccompanied)	
296	138b	Song at Sunset	1978	Choral (unaccompanied)	Text by Walt Whitman.
297	139	Violin Concerto No. 2	1978-79	Concerto	
298	140	Notater (Notations)	1979	Chamber	For 3 trombones (alto, tenor, bass) and tuba.
299		Konstateringer (Statements)	1979	Choral (unaccompanied)	
300	141	Guitar Sonata No. 1	1979	Guitar	
301	142	Guitar Sonata No. 2	1979	Guitar	
302	143a	Accordion Sonata No. 1	1979	Accordion	
303		Bogtrykkemaskinen (The Printing Press)	1979	Chamber	For violin and piano.
304	144	Symphony No. 11	1980-81	Orchestral (symphony)	
305	145	Sonata for recorder and harpsichord	1980	Chamber	
306	146	String Quartet No. 16	1981	Chamber (string quartet)	
307	147	Flute Concerto No. 2	1981-82	Concerto	
308	148	Music with Horn	1981	Chamber	For violin, horn and piano.
309	149	5 Intermezzi	1981	Guitar	
310	150	Biblical Cantata	1981	Choral	With orchestra.
311	151	Brúgvar (Bridges)	1982	Choral (unaccompanied)	
312	152	String Quartet No. 17, Mattinata (Morning)	1982-83	Chamber (string quartet)	
313	156	String Quartet No. 19, Serata (Evening)	1982-85	Chamber (string quartet)	
314	153	String Quartet No. 18, Giornata (Day)	1982	Chamber (string quartet)	
315	154	2 Sarvig Psalms	1983	Choral (unaccompanied)	
316	155	Gioco (Game) for string trio	1983	Chamber	
317	157	Concerto for Brass	1983	Brass	Includes percussion.
318	158a	Liber Canticorum Book Va - Hominis dies	1984	Choral (unaccompanied)	
319	158b	Liber Canticorum Book Vb - Laudate Dominum	1984	Choral (unaccompanied)	
320	159	Ballata (Ballad) for piano quartet	1984	Chamber	
321	161	Ode til sjælen (Ode to the Soul)	1985	Choral	With brass and organ accompaniment.
322	160	String Quartet No. 20, Notturno (Night)	1985	Chamber (string quartet)	
323	162	Tuba Sonata	1985	Chamber	
324	163	Psalm 84	1985	Choral (unaccompanied)	
325	164	To a Pine Tree	1986	Orchestral prelude	
326	165	String Quintet	1986	Chamber	A 'double bass' quintet.
327	166	To a Dolphin	1986	Orchestral prelude	
328	167	Duo Concertanto for violin and guitar	1986	Chamber	
329	168	To a Maple Tree	1986	Orchestral prelude	
330	169	Rejsende (Travellers)	1986	Choral (unaccompanied)	
331	170	To a Willow Tree	1987	Orchestral prelude	
332	171	Intermezzo concertante for tuba and string orchestra	1987	Orchestra with soloist	
333	172a	Trombone Sonata	1987	Chamber	
334	172b	Translation	1987	Chamber	Revised 1989. For violin, viola, cello, double bass and piano.
335	172c	To a Living Stone	1987	Orchestral prelude	
336	173	Psalm 65	1987	Choral (unaccompanied)	
337	174	To the Seagulls and Cormorants	1987	Orchestral prelude	
338	175	Symphony No. 12	1988	Orchestral (symphony)	
339	176	Parlare del più e del meno (To Talk About This and That)	1988	Guitar	
340	177	Capriccio for clarinet and piano	1988	Chamber	
341	178	Solo Viola Sonata	1988	Solo Instrument	
342	179a	Accordion Sonata No. 2, Burlesco	1989	Accordion	
343	179b	3 + 3 = 5	1989	Piano	A 3-movement recomposition of M. 342, which is in 5 movements.
344	180	To the Pollution of Nature	1989	Orchestral prelude	
345	181	Winter	1989	Choral (unaccompanied)	
346	182	Epos	1989-90	Chamber	For 2 pianos and 2 percussion.
347		Reminiscenser (Reminiscences) for violin	1990	Solo Instrument	
348	183	Die Erfüllung (The Fulfilment)	1990	Choral	Revised 1993. With wind and brass accompaniment.
349	93b	Sonatina for oboe and piano	1990	Chamber	Revision of M. 231.
350		2 Psalms	1990	Choral	With piano or organ accompaniment. First psalm is missing the accompanying text.
351	184	To the Victoria Embankment	1990	Orchestral prelude	
352	185	Egilskvad (Egill's Ballad)	1990-91	Vocal	Revised 1992. With brass quintet accompaniment.
353	186	Eco	1991	Chamber	For clarinet, cello and piano.
354	187	To the Calm Sea	1991	Orchestral prelude	
355		3 songs	1991	Vocal	Revised 1993. To texts by Ibsen.
356	188	To the Unsettled Weather	1991	Orchestral prelude	
357	189	Viola Concerto	1991-92	Concerto	
358		Via Peria (Per's Path), for string quartet	1992	Chamber (string quartet)	Included in Op. 190b.
359	190a	Sværm (Swarm), for 2 violins	1992	Chamber	
360	190b	Sværm (Swarm), for string quartet	1992	Chamber (string quartet)	Arrangement of Op. 190a.
361	191a	Canción y danza (Song and dance)	1992	Chamber	For recorder and guitar.
362	192	Symphony No. 13	1993-94	Orchestral (symphony)	
363	193	Haiduc (Marauders)	1993	Chamber	For violin and piano.
364	194	Vinter (Winter)	1993-94	Incidental music	To accompany photographic slides by Meta Holmboe, the composer's wife.
365		Untitled work for orchestra (14th symphony?)	1994-95	Orchestral	Incomplete. Incorporated into Op. 195.
366		String quartet	1994-95	Chamber (string quartet)	Incomplete. Incorporated into Op. 195.
367	191b	Springbuk (Springbok), for recorder	1995	Solo Instrument	
368	195	String Quartet Concerto	1995-96	Concerto	Holmboe's last completed work.
	196	Ave Maria	1996	Vocal	With organ accompaniment.
	197	String Quartet No. 21, Quartetto Sereno	1996	Chamber (string quartet)	Completed by Per Nørgård.
x2P		2 pieces for piano	by 1959	Piano	Published in Pro piano.
x2S		2 Songs		Choral (unaccompanied)	Texts by Shakespeare, translated into Danish.
x3P		3 pieces for piano	by 1952	Piano	Published in Via nova. 2nd piece is for 4 hands.
xFa		Fantastiske stykker (Fantastical pieces)		Piano	Possibly incomplete.
xHv		Hvad bøgetræet sang (What the beech tree sang)		Choral (unaccompanied)	Text by Hans Christian Andersen.
xPiè		Pièce pour deux mains et piano op. 00 (Piece for two hands and piano op. 00)		Piano	In graphic notation.
xPil		Piletræet bøjer sig (The willow is bending)	1929	Vocal	Incomplete. Date is approximate.
xPl		Pludselig blev mørket lyst igen (Suddenly the darkness became light again)	by 1994	Choral (unaccompanied)	Also version for solo voice and piano.
xSc		Schade, Digte (Schade, Poems)		Vocal	Texts by Jens August Schade. For soprano and baritone with flute, violin, cello and piano accompaniment.
xSo		Sommer (Summer)	by 1943	Choral (unaccompanied)	
ySi		Arrangement of Sigmundskvæðið (Sigmund's ballad)	by 1976	Choral (unaccompanied)	
yUn		Arrangements of 7 folksongs	1983	Chamber	For balalaika/recorder and guitar.
