= Hannah Pritchard =

English actress (1711–1768)

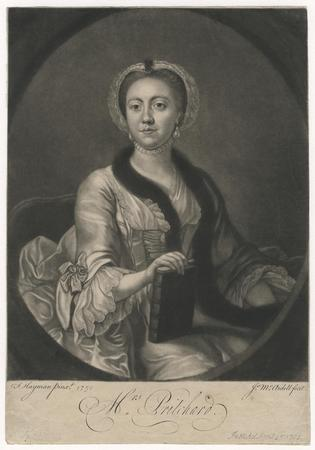
- Pritchard illustrated by James MacArdell, 1762
- Born: Hannah Vaughan; 1711
- Died: 1768 (aged 56–57)
- Occupation: Actress

Hannah Pritchard (née Vaughan, 1711 – 1768) was an English actress who regularly played opposite David Garrick. She performed many significant Shakespearean roles and created on stage many important female roles by contemporary playwrights.

== Life ==
She was born in 1711, and married in early life a poor actor named Pritchard. As Mrs. Pritchard she acted in 1733, at Fielding and Hippisley's booth, Bartholomew Fair, the part of Loveit in an opera called A Cure for Covetousness, or the Cheats of Scapin. She sang with great effect "Sweet, if you love me, smiling, turn". A duet between her and an actor called Salway was very popular, and she was berhymed by a writer in the Daily Post, who spoke of this as her first essay, and predicted for her "a transportation to a brighter stage".

This was soon accomplished, since she appeared at the Haymarket Theatre on 26 Sept. 1733 as Nell in The Devil to Pay of Coffey. She was one of the company known as the "Comedians of his Majesty's Revels", the more conspicuous members of which had seceded from Drury Lane. During her first season she was seen as Dorcas in the Mock Doctor, Phillis (the country lass) in The Livery Rake Trapp'd, or the Disappointed Country Lass, Ophelia, Edging in The Careless Husband, Cleora in the Opera of Operas, or Tom Thumb the Great, an alteration of Fielding's Tragedy of Tragedies, Lappet in The Miser, Phædra in Amphitryon, Hob's Mother in Flora, Sylvia in The Double Gallant, Shepherdess in the Festival, Peasant Woman in the Burgomaster Trick'd, and Belina in Miller's Mother-in-Law. Two or three of the last-named parts are original. Her appearance during her first season in so wide a range of parts seems to indicate more experience than she can be shown to possess. Two Miss Vaughans, who might have been her sisters, but neither of whom could have been herself, had previously been heard of.

Returning with the company to Drury Lane, she played there, 30 April 1734, Mrs. Fainall in The Way of the World. At Drury Lane she remained until 1740–1, going in the summer of 1735 to the Haymarket, where she was Beatrice in The Anatomist, Lady Townly, and the original Combrush in the Honest Yorkshireman.

At Drury Lane, meanwhile, she played a wide range of characters, chiefly, though not exclusively, comic. The most noteworthy of these are Lady Wouldbe in Volpone, Mrs. Flareit in Love's Last Shift, Lucy Lockit, Lady Haughty in the Silent Woman, Doll Common, Mrs. Termagant in The Squire of Alsatia, Pert, Mrs. Foresight, Berinthia in The Relapse, Araminta, and afterwards Belinda, in the Old Bachelor, Lady Anne, Duchess of York in King Richard III, Angelica in Love for Love, Lady Macduff, Anne Boleyn, Leonora in The Libertine, Mrs. Sullen, Monimia, Desdemona, Rosalind, Viola in Twelfth Night, and Nerissa in The Merchant of Venice.

A couple of original parts stand prominently out – Dorothea to the Maria of Mrs. Clive in Miller's Man of Taste, 6 March 1735, and Peggy in Dodsley's King and the Miller of Mansfield, 1 Feb. 1737. On 1 Jan. 1742, as Arabella in The London Cuckolds of Ravenscroft, she first appeared at Covent Garden, where she played, among other parts, Sylvia in The Recruiting Officer, Paulina in The Winter's Tale, Nottingham in Essex, Queen in Hamlet, Elvira in the Spanish Fryar, Mrs. Frail, and Doris in Æsop,

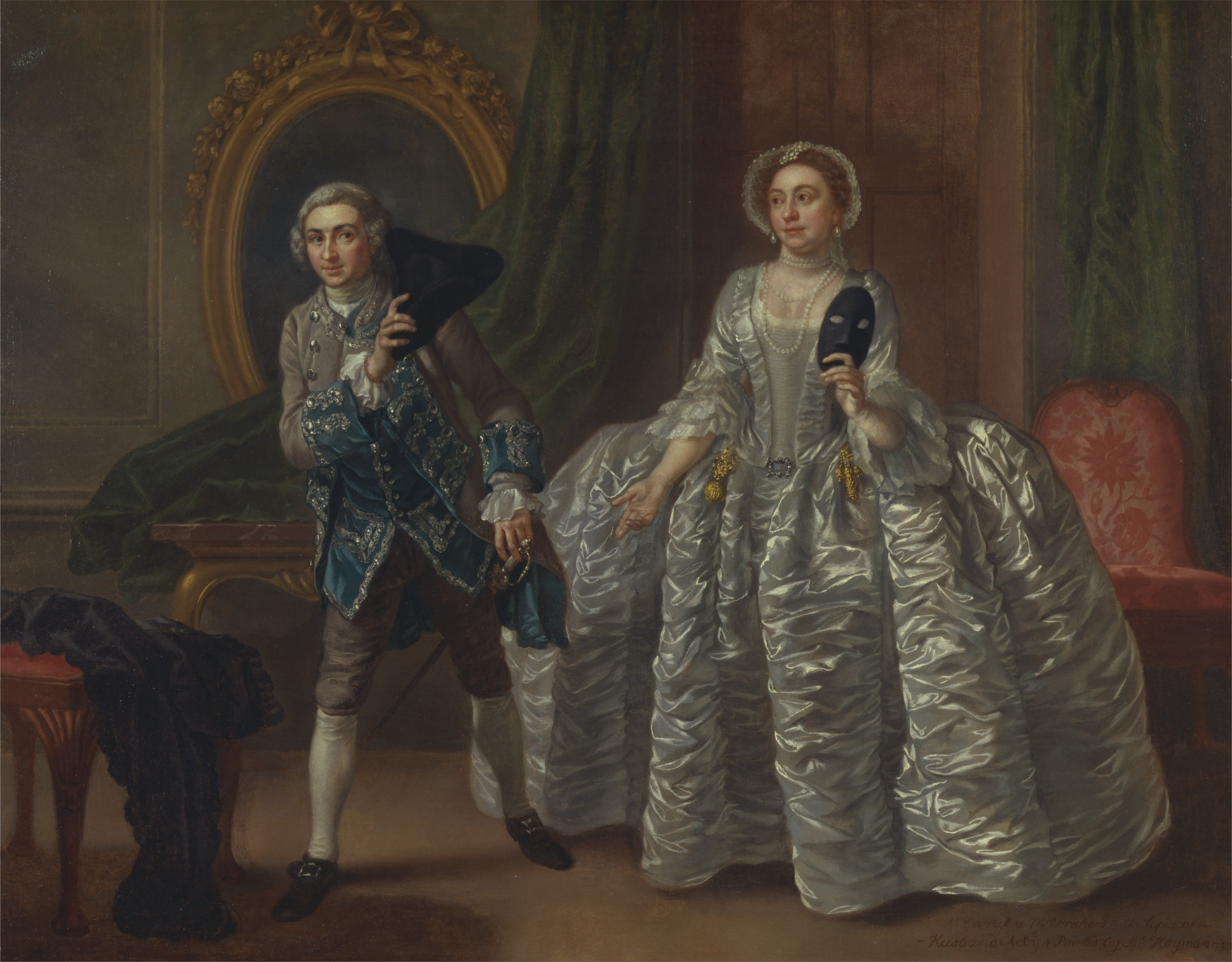
David Garrick and Mrs. Pritchard in Benjamin Hoadley's The Suspicious Husband

Next year she returned to Drury Lane, playing Amanda in The Relapse, Margarita in Rule a Wife and have a Wife, Elvira in Love Makes a Man, Jane Shore, Belvidera, and Kitty Pry in the Lying Valet, and was, on 17 Feb. 1743, the original Clarinda in Fielding's Wedding Day. In January 1744 she was once more at Covent Garden, where she remained until 1747, adding to her repertory Isabella in Measure for Measure, Queen Katharine, Calista, Andromache, Lady in Comus, Abra-Mulé, Lady Macbeth, Queen in Richard III, Portia in Julius Cæsar, Aspasia, Lætitia in Old Bachelor, Evadne in Maid's Tragedy, Mariamne, Lady Brute, Maria in the Nonjuror, Mrs. Ford, Portia in Merchant of Venice, Beatrice, Helena in All's well that ends well, Marcia in Cato, and numerous parts of corresponding importance. Her only 'creations' were Constance in Colley Cibber's Papal Tyranny in the Reign of King John, 15 Feb. 1745; Tag in David Garrick's Miss in her Teens, 17 Jan. 1747; and Clarinda in Hoadley's The Suspicious Husband, 12 Feb. 1747.

When in 1747–8 Garrick became patentee of Drury Lane, Mrs. Pritchard accompanied him thither, reappearing on 23 Nov. 1747 as Lady Lurewell in The Constant Couple. She was advertised to act George Barnwell for the benefit of her husband, who was then connected with the management of the theatre, but the piece was changed. She played Oroclea in John Ford's Lover's Melancholy, "not acted these 100 years".

In 1748–9 she played two original parts, one of which, at least, exercised an important influence on her reputation. This was Irene in Samuel Johnson's Mahomet and Irene, since known as Irene, which was given on 6 Feb. 1749. In this, as first produced, Irene was strangled on the stage. Audiences that accepted the suffocation scene in Othello need not, perhaps, have been expected to be more sensitive with regard to the bowstring in Irene. The audience, however, on the first night of Mahomet and Irene shouted 'murder,’ and Mrs. Pritchard, unable to finish the scene, retired from the stage. The termination was altered; but Johnson seems never to have forgiven a woman he associated with his misfortune.

Her other original part, 15 April, was Merope in Aaron Hill's adaptation from Voltaire. On 24 Feb. 1750 she was the original Horatia in Whitehead's Roman Father, adapted from Les Horaces of Pierre Corneille, on 2 Feb. 1751 the first Aurora in Moore's Gil Blas, on 17 Feb. 1752 the first Orphisa in Francis's Eugenia, and 7 Feb. 1753 the first Mrs. Beverley in the Gamester, perhaps her greatest part.

The season of 1753–4 saw her in three original characters: Boadicea in Glover's tragedy so named, Catherine in Catherine and Petruchio, Garrick's adaptation of The Taming of the Shrew, and Creusa in Whitehead's Creusa. Among other parts that she had sustained under Garrick were Lady Alworth in A New Way to Pay Old Debts, Emilia in Othello, Lady Brumpton in the Funeral, Cleopatra in All for Love, Lady Betty Modish, Millamant, Zara in the Mourning Bride, Lady Truman in the Drummer, Queen Elizabeth in Jones's Essex, Hermione, Countess of Rousillon, and Estifania. On 9 Oct. 1756 she played Lady Capulet to the Juliet of her daughter, Miss Pritchard, and the Romeo of Garrick.

In Home's 'Agis' on 21 Feb. 1758 Mrs. Pritchard was the first Agesistrata, and in Arthur Murphy's Desert Island on 24 Jan. 1760 the first Constantia. On 3 Jan. 1761 she was the original Queen Elizabeth in Brookes's 'Earl of Essex,’ and on 12 Feb. the original Mrs. Oakly in Colman's Jealous Wife. On 11 Dec. she was the first Hecuba in John Delap's Hecuba. In Mallet's Elvira on 19 Jan. 1763 she was the first Queen, and in Mrs. Sheridan's Discovery on 3 Feb. the first Lady Medway. On 10 Dec. she was the original Mrs. Etherdown in Frances Sheridan's The Dupe. The same season saw her act Roxana in the Rival Queens. For her benefit on 15 March 1766 she had an original part in Charles Shadwell's Irish Hospitality, and on 12 April was the first Dame Ursula in William Kenrick's Falstaff's Wedding. On 5 Dec. 1767 she played her last original part, Mrs. Mildmay, the heroine of The Widowed Wife of Kenrick. During the season of 1767–8 she gave a series of farewell performances, her last appearance taking place on 24 April 1768 as Lady Macbeth, when she spoke an epilogue by David Garrick. Another epilogue by John Keats, written for the same occasion, but unspoken, appears in his poems.

Mrs. Pritchard, whose fortune appears to have been imperilled, if not impaired, by the action of her brother, Henry Vaughan, who was an actor, led a wholly blameless and reputable life; a portion of her considerable estate was left her by a distant relative, a Mr. Leonard, an attorney of Lyons Inn. An undefined scheme of her husband to benefit actors is mentioned by Davies. She lived at one time in York Street, Covent Garden. Mrs. Pritchard did not long survive her retirement, but died in August 1768 in Bath. A monument to her memory was placed in Poets' Corner, Westminster Abbey.

== Family ==
A son seems to have been for a time treasurer of Drury Lane Theatre. The début in Juliet, as Miss Pritchard, of Mrs. Pritchard's daughter, Hannah Mary, at Drury Lane on 9 Oct. 1756, caused a sensation. She had an exquisitely pretty face, and had been taught by Garrick. She played her mother's parts of Lady Betty Modish in The Careless Husband, Beatrice, Marcia, Isabella, Miranda, Horatia, Perdita, &c., but lacked her mother's higher gifts, and never fulfilled expectations. Her chief successes were obtained as Harriot in The 'Jealous Wife of Colman, and Fanny in The Clandestine Marriage of Garrick and Colman, both original parts. She married, near 1762, the actor John "Gentleman" Palmer, retired the same year as her mother, 1767–8, and, after her husband's accidental death in 1768, married a Mr. Lloyd, a political writer.

== Assessment ==
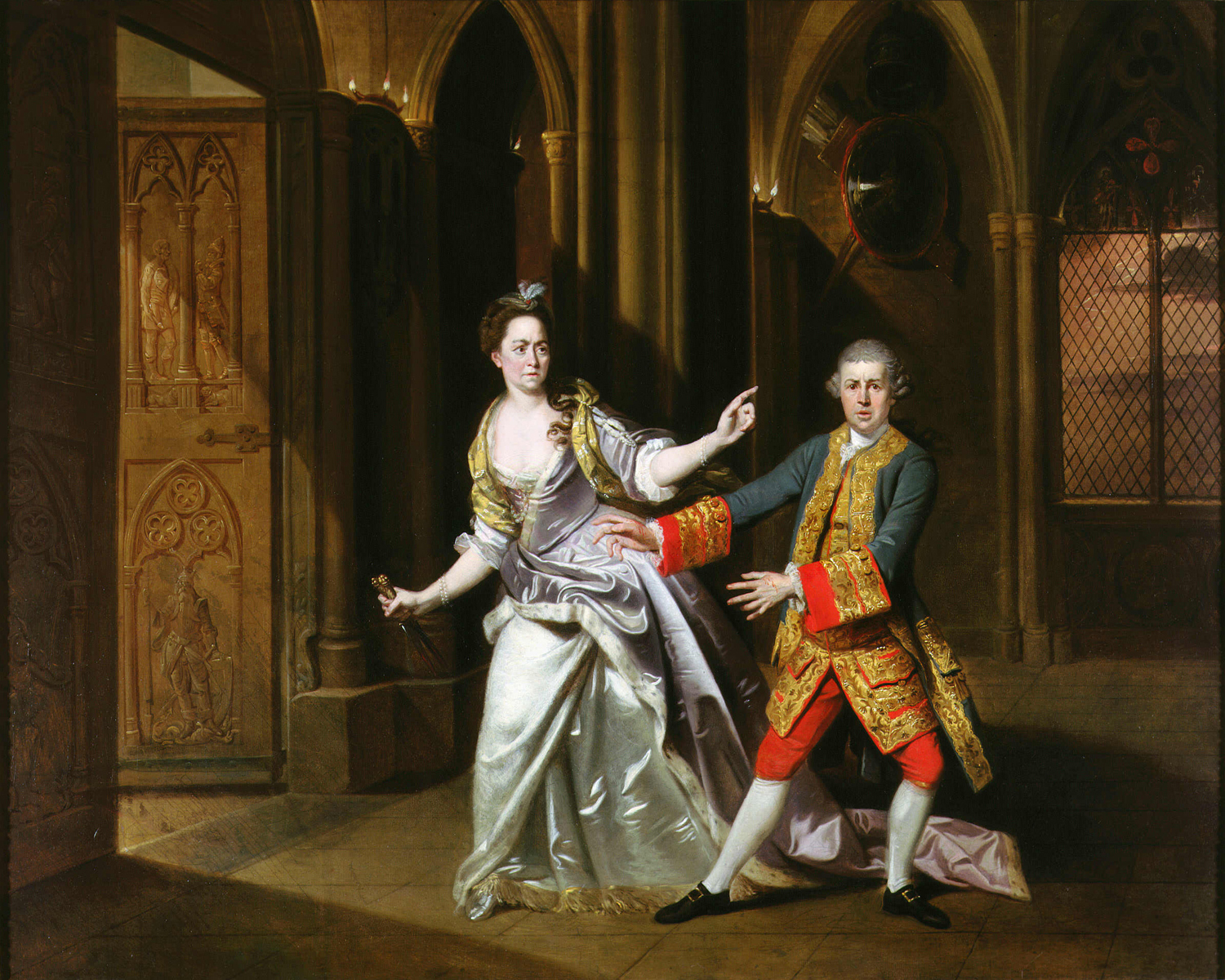
Prichard as Lady Macbeth, with Garrick. Painting by Johan Zoffany

General testimony shows Mrs. Pritchard to have been one of the most conspicuous stars in the Garrick galaxy. Richard Cumberland and Dibdin give her precedence of Mrs. Cibber. Dibdin says that Cibber's remark "that the life of beauty is too short to form a complete actress" proved so true in relation to Mrs. Pritchard that she was seen to fresh admiration till in advanced age she retired with a fortune. She was held the greatest Lady Macbeth of her day (until Sarah Siddons took over the role and redefined Shakespearean theatre), her scene with the ghost being especially admired. The Queen in Hamlet, Estifania, and Doll Common were also among her greatest parts. Leigh Hunt is convinced that she was a really great genius, equally capable of the highest and lowest parts. Charles Churchill praises her highly in the Rosciad, especially as the Jealous Wife. Horace Walpole, who knew and admired her, praises her Maria in the Nonjuror, and her Beatrice, which he preferred to Miss Farren's, and would not allow his Mysterious Mother to be played after her retirement from the stage, as she alone could have presented the Countess.

Mrs. Pritchard had, however, an imperfect education, and other critics give less favourable accounts of her. On one occasion Johnson declared her good but affected in her manner; another time he calls her "a mechanical player". In private life he declared she was "a vulgar idiot; she would talk of her gownd, but when she appeared upon the stage seemed to be inspired by gentility and understanding". "It is wonderful how little mind she had", he once said, affirming she had never read the tragedy of Macbeth all through. "She no more thought of the play out of which her part was taken than a shoemaker thinks of the skin out of which the piece of leather out of which he is making a pair of shoes is cut". Campbell, who could not have seen her, says in his Life of Siddons, unjustly, that something of her Bartholomew Fair origin may be traced in her professional characteristics, declares that she "never rose to the finest grade, even of comedy, but was most famous in scolds and viragos"; adds that in tragedy, though she "had a large imposing manner" (in fact, like her daughter, she was small), "she wanted grace", and says that Garrick told Tate Wilkinson that she was "apt to blubber her sorrows". Most of this condemnation is an over-accentuation of faults indicated by Davies.

Francis Hayman painted her twice – once separately, and again (as Clarinda), with Garrick as Ranger, in a scene from Hoadley's Suspicious Husband. Johann Zoffany represented her as Lady Macbeth, with Garrick as Macbeth. This, like Hayman's separate portrait, has been engraved. All three pictures are in the Mathews collection at the Garrick Club. A fourth portrait, representing her as Hermione, was painted by Robert Edge Pine.

== Sources ==
- Anthony Vaughan, Born to Please: Hannah Pritchard, Actress, 1711–1768 (London: The Society for Theatre Research, 1979)
