= The Discovery (play) =

1763 play

- Original language: English
- Written by: Frances Sheridan
- Genre: Comedy
- Setting: England, present day

Premiere
- Date: 5 February 1763
- Place: Theatre Royal, Drury Lane, London

The Discovery: A Comedy in Five Acts is a comedy by Frances Sheridan. The play premiered on 5 February 1763, at the Drury Lane Theatre, London. The actors being David Garrick as Sir Anthony Branville, Frances' husband Thomas Sheridan as Lord Medway, William O'Brien as Sir Harry Flutter, Charles Holland as Colonel Medway, Mrs. Hannah Pritchard as Lady Medway, Mary Ann Yates as Mrs Knightly, and Jane Pope as Lady Flutter. Garrick agreed that Thomas Sheridan should play the lead role and be paid with two night's profits.

Aldous Huxley controversially rewrote the play and provided a new ending, for a Chatto and Windus edition in 1924.
