= Alicia Sheridan Le Fanu =

Irish writer

- Born: Alicia Sheridan; 1753
- Died: 4 September 1817 (aged 63–64); Dublin, Ireland
- Known for: writer
- Parent(s): Thomas Sheridan and Frances Chamberlaine Sheridan

Alicia "Lissy" Sheridan Le Fanu (1753–1817) was an Anglo-Irish writer. She was the daughter of actor Thomas Sheridan and his wife, writer Frances Chamberlaine Sheridan. She was the sister of Richard Brinsley Sheridan and Betsy Sheridan and the aunt of writer Alicia LeFanu (with whom she is sometimes confused).

== Life ==
Le Fanu spent most of her childhood in Dublin with her brother Charles, while Richard and Betsy lived in England. She attended Samuel Whyte's school on Grafton Street briefly, and later was taught by her parents. Her father was instructed by Samuel Johnson to "Turn your daughter [Alicia] loose in a library". She married Joseph Le Fanu on 11 October 1781.

Thomas Moore referred to Le Fanu as "the Dublin Mrs. Lefanu". Among her close literary associates in Dublin, Ireland were Sydney, Lady Morgan and Mary Tighe. Some histories suggest that she acted as a mentor to Lady Morgan. Her nephew, Thomas Sheridan, oversaw the final preparations for the staging of her play, The Sons of Erin, in the Lyceum Theatre in London on 13 April 1812, when she could not. It has been noted that Le Fanu has not been the subject of much academic research, her niece, Alicia recalled that as a young child "began to show signs of that love of literature for which she was afterwards distinguished." The lack of historical material relating to her literary output has been attributed to her primarily being engaged in "private theatricals", mostly sharing their writings in letters and private conversations.

Le Fanu died on 4 September 1817 at the Royal Hibernian Military Hospital, Phoenix Park, Dublin, where her son was chaplain. She was buried at St Peter's churchyard. Sheridan Le Fanu was her grandson.

== Select bibliography ==
- Lucy Osmond. A Story (1804)
- The Sons of Erin; Or, Modern Sentiment (1812)
