= Betsy Sheridan =

Anglo Irish diarist

Ann Elizabeth Sheridan Le Fanu (1758– 4 January 1837) was an Anglo-Irish diarist and novelist.

She was a daughter of Irish stage actor Thomas Sheridan and his wife, the novelist and playwright Frances Sheridan Chamberlaine.

Her siblings were the satirist Richard Brinsley Sheridan, the politician Charles Francis Sheridan, and the playwright Alicia Sheridan Le Fanu.

She married Captain Henry Le Fanu in 1791, and their daughter Alicia Le Fanu was also a writer. Henry was the brother of Alicia Sheridan’s husband, Joseph.

By the 1770s, Elizabeth was transcribing her father’s educational writings, and she published her first novel in 1780.

In 1798, she opened a day-school in Bath.

She died in Leamington Spa in England; she left three children.

== Works ==
Her works included;

- Emeline: a moral tale (1780)
- The Triumph of Prudence Over Passion, Or, The History of Miss Mortimer and Miss Fitzgerald. Four Courts Press. 1781. ISBN 9781846822896. pseudonym: "the Authoress Of Emeline"
- Lefanu, Elizabeth Sheridan (1986). Betsy Sheridan's Journal: Letters from Sheridan's Sister, 1784–1786 and 1788–1790. Literary Licensing, LLC. ISBN 1258515520. – journal entries compiled and edited by relative William LeFanu
- Lucy Osmond: a story (1803)
- The India voyage. G. and J. Robinson. 1804. ISBN 3628480477.
- The sister: a tale (1810)

== External sites ==
- Corvey Women Writers on the Web author page
