= List of compositions by George Onslow =

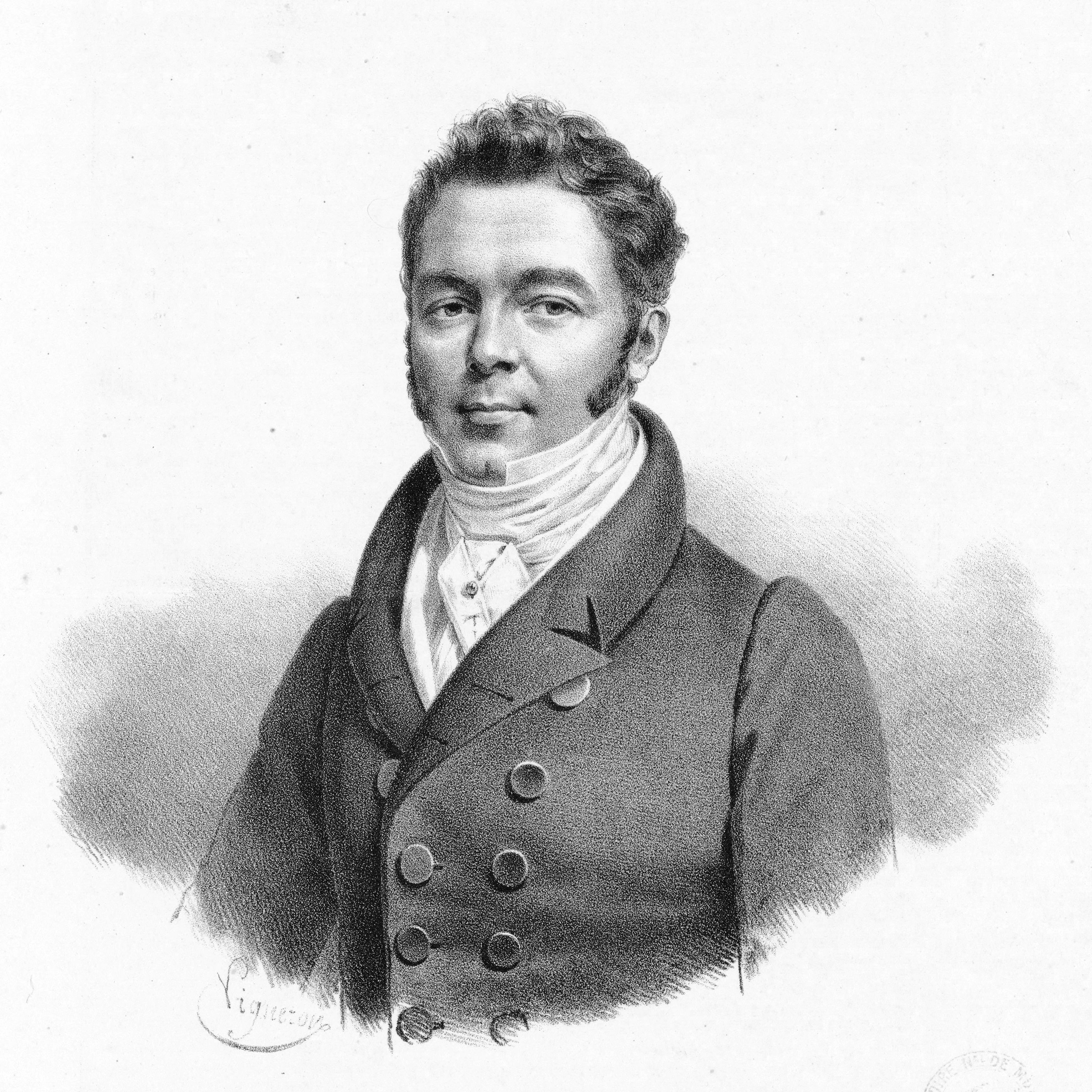
George Onslow

This is a list of compositions by George Onslow.

== With opus numbers ==
- Op. 1, 3 String Quintets; 1806
- Op. 2, Sonata for Piano; 1806
- Op. 3, 3 Trios for Piano, Violin, and Violoncello; 1806
- Op. 4, 3 String Quartets; 1806
- Op. 5, Scottish Airs for Piano; 1810
- Op. 6, Toccata for Piano; 1810
- Op. 7, Sonata for Piano Four Hands; 1811
- Op. 8, 3 String Quartets; about 1812
- Op. 9, 3 String Quartets; about 1812
- Op. 10, 3 String Quartets; about 1812
- Op. 11, 3 Sonatas for Violin and Piano; 1816
- Op. 12, Variations On "Charming Gabrielle" for Piano; 1817
- Op. 13, Variations On "As Soon As The Light" for Piano; 1817
- Op. 14, 3 Trios for Piano, Violin, and Violoncello; 1818
- Op. 15, Sonata for Violin and Piano; 1819
- Op. 16, 3 Sonatas for Viola / Violoncello and Piano; 1819
- Op. 17, String Quintet; 1821
- Op. 18, String Quintet; 1821
- Op. 19, String Quintet; 1821
- Op. 20, Trio for Piano, Violin, and Violoncello; 1822
- Op. 21, 3 String Quartets; 1822
- Op. 22, Sonata for Piano Four Hands; 1823
- Op. 23, String Quintet; 1823
- Op. 24, String Quintet; 1823
- Op. 25, String Quintet; 1823
- Op. 26, Trio for Piano, Violin, and Violoncello; 1824
- Op. 27, Trio for Piano, Violin, and Violoncello; 1824
- Op. 28, English Theme for Piano; 1824
- Op. 29, Sonata for Violin and Piano; 1824
- Op. 30, Sextet for Piano and Winds; 1825
- Op. 31, Sonata for Violin and Piano; 1825
- Op. 32, String Quintet; 1826
- Op. 33, String Quintet; 1827/8
- Op. 34, String Quintet; 1827/8
- Op. 35, String Quintet; 1827/8
- Op. 36, 3 String Quartets; 1828
- Op. 37, String Quintet; 1828
- Op. 38, String Quintet; 1829
- Op. 39, String Quintet; 1830
- Op. 40, String Quintet; 1830
- Op. 41, First Symphony; 1830
- Op. 42, Second Symphony; 1831
- Op. 43, String Quintet; 1832
- Op. 44, String Quintet; 1832
- Op. 45, String Quintet; 1832
- Op. 46, 3 String Quartets; 1832/3
- Op. 47, String Quartet; 1832/3
- Op. 48, String Quartet; 1833
- Op. 49, String Quartet; 1833
- Op. 50, String Quartet; 1833
- Op. 51, String Quintet; 1834
- Op. 52, String Quartet; 1834
- Op. 53, String Quartet; 1834
- Op. 54, String Quartet; 1834
- Op. 55, String Quartet; 1834
- Op. 56, String Quartet; 1834
- Op. 57, String Quintet; 1835
- Op. 58, String Quintet; 1836
- Op. 59, String Quintet; 1837
- Op. 60, Piece Arranged in two suites for string quartet; 1837
- Op. 61, String Quintet; 1837
- Op. 62, String Quartet; 1841
- Op. 63, String Quartet; 1841
- Op. 64, String Quartet; 1841
- Op. 65, String Quartet; 1842
- Op. 66, String Quartet; 1843
- Op. 67, String Quintet; 1843
- Op. 68, String Quintet; 1844
- Op. 69, String Quartet; 1845/6
- Op. 70, Quintet for Piano and Strings; 1846
- Op. 71, Fourth Symphony; 1846
- Op. 72, String Quintet; 1847/8
- Op. 73, String Quintet; 1847/8
- Op. 74, String Quintet; 1847/8
- Op. 75, String Quintet; 1847/8
- Op. 76, Quintet for Piano and Strings; 1848
- Op. 77a, Nonet for Winds and Strings; 1848
- Op. 77b, Sextet for Winds and Strings; 1848
- Op. 78, String Quintet; 1848
- Op. 79a, Septet for Piano, Winds, and Contrabass; 1849
- Op. 79b, Quintet for Piano and Strings; 1849
- Op. 80, String Quintet; 1849/50
- Op. 81, Wind Quintet; 1850
- Op. 82, String Quintet; 1850
- Op. 83, Trio for Piano, Violin, and Violoncello; 1851

== Without opus numbers ==
- Six Pieces for Piano; ?
- The Two Uncles: opera; 1806 – unpublished
- Sonata For Piano; about 1806 – unpublished
- The Bodyguard: romance; 1815
- The Mayor Of La Vega: lyrical drama; 1822–4
- "Andante" for Piano; 1824
- "Spring": vocal nocturne; about 1825
- "The Young Greeks": chorus with couplets; 1826
- The Book Peddler, Or The Lumberjack's Son: comic opera; 1826
- The First Christian Baron: romance; about 1829
- Third Symphony; 1833/4 (expanded from string quintet opus 32)
- "Ave Maria" for four voices; 1835
- Dante in Paradise: vocal ballad; about 1835 – unpublished
- Le duc de Guise, ou Les ėtats de Blois: opéra comique; 1837
- Trio; 1841 – unpublished
- "Andantino" for oboe and piano; 1843 – unpublished
- "Allegro Agitato" for piano in G minor; 1844 – unpublished
- "Allegro Agitato" for piano in B♭ minor; ? – unpublished
- "Allegro Moderato" in F♯ minor; ? – unpublished
- "Andantino Con Moto" for piano in E minor; 1844 – unpublished
- "Daydream" for piano; 1844
- "Cain, The Cursed, Or Abel's Death": dramatic scene; 1845
- Fantasy for Piano on "The Guardian Angel"; 1849
- "The Regrets!": romance; ?
