= Alicia Le Fanu =

Irish poet and writer

- Born: 1791; Dublin, Ireland
- Died: 29 January 1867 (aged 75–76); Chipping Norton, England
- Known for: writer
- Parent(s): Betsy Sheridan; Henry Le Fanu

Alicia Le Fanu (1791 – 29 January 1867) was an Irish poet and writer.

== Biography ==
Alicia Le Fanu was the daughter of Betsy Sheridan and Captain Henry Le Fanu, and a granddaughter of actor Thomas Sheridan and his wife, writer Frances Sheridan. She had a younger sister, Harriet. The family moved from Dublin to Kingsbridge, Devon in the 1790s, and later Bath, from where her mother wrote letters mentioning Le Fanu's emerging literary talents, she considered her daughter's talent for writing to be "much superior" to her own. Her mother encouraged her writing, and ensured that the family library held books that would interest and educate Le Fanu. She began her publishing career in 1809. Le Fanu moved to Leamington Spa around 1822 with her mother, following the deaths of her father and sister.

The exact date of her death is generally stated to be unknown and has been asserted as early as 29 January 1826, but is usually stated to have been in or after 1844. She is known to have been alive in 1844, when she received £150 from the Royal Bounty Fund, secured on her behalf by her cousin, Caroline Norton. However, Fitzer has determined that she died from a subdural effusion on 29 January 1867, while boarding with a family in Chipping Norton.

Le Fanu's poems are moralistic fables, while her historical romances are melodramas, with some satire and elements of comedy. The 1824 Memoirs of the Life and Writings of Mrs Frances Sheridan was an account of her grandmother's life but it is accepted that it contains a number of unsubstantiated facts.

== Select bibliography ==
- The Flowers; or, The Sylphid Queen: A Fairy Tale in Verse (London: J. Harris, 1809)
- Rosara’s Chain; or, The Choice of Life: a poem (London: M. J. Godwin, 1812)
- Strathallan (London: Sherwood, Neely & Jones, 1816)
- Helen Monteagle (London: Sherwood, Neely & Jones, 1818)
- Leolin Abbey: A Novel (London: Longman, Hurst, Rees, Orme and Brown, 1819)
- Don Juan De Las Sierras: A Romance (London: Newman & Co., 1823)
- Tales of a Tourist (London: Newman & Co., 1824)
- Memoirs of the Life and Writings of Mrs Frances Sheridan (London: G. and W. B. Whittaker, 1824)
- Henry the Fourth of France: A Romance (London: Newman & Co., 1826)
