= William LeFanu =

Irish medical librarian

- Born: 9 July 1904; Bray, County Wicklow, Ireland
- Died: 1 April 1995 (aged 90); Norwich, England

William "Billy" Richard LeFanu FSA (9 July 1904 – 1 April 1995) was an Irish medical librarian. He was the husband of composer Elizabeth Maconchy.

== Life ==
LeFanu was born in Bray, County Wicklow, the son of Thomas Philip Le Fanu and his wife Florence Sophia Mabel (née Sullivan). The family were descended from Huguenots. He was educated in England at Eton and King's College, Cambridge.

In 1930, he married the composer Elizabeth Maconchy (later Dame Elizabeth Maconchy). They had two daughters, Elizabeth Anna (known as Anna, born 1939) and Nicola LeFanu (born 1947).

LeFanu worked as an assistant librarian in the Hellenic Society in 1927, before taking up a post as librarian at the Royal College of Surgeons in London in 1929, remaining there for almost 40 years until his retirement in 1968. He evacuated the books before the college and library were destroyed in the Blitz, while also working as a air raid warden and member of the Home Guard. In 1953, he served as chairman of the meeting of the International Congress of Medical Librarians in London, and vice-president for the 1963 meeting in Washington. He advised many other medical libraries, and was a lecturer and examiner at the University College London School of Librarians.

He wrote a biography of Edward Jenner (1951), on Betsy Sheridan's Journal (1960), a catalogue of Jonathan Swift's library (1988), and on the writings of Nehemiah Grew (1990). From 1956 to 1959, he served as the President of the Huguenot Society, and from 1959 to 1979 as Chairman of its publications committee. He was also a member of the Linnaean Society, and had a collection of fruit trees of unusual varieties in his orchard. He also served as director of the French Hospital from 1956 to 1959. In 1968, LeFanu delivered the first W. J. Bishop Memorial Lecture which marked the 20 years since the foundation of the Medical Section of the Library Association, it is now known as the Bishop and LeFanu Lecture.

LeFanu died in Norwich on 1 April 1995.
