= Frances Sheridan =

British writer

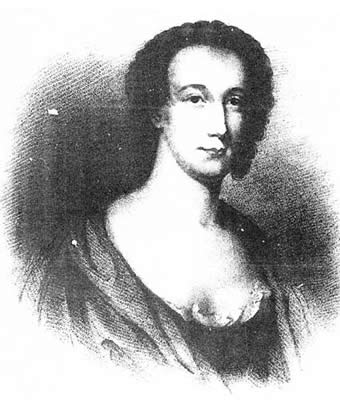
- Frances Sheridan, from The History of Nourjahad
- Born: Frances Chamberlaine; 1724; Dublin, Ireland
- Died: 26 September 1766 (aged 41–42)
- Occupations: Novelist, playwright
- Spouse: Thomas Sheridan (m. 1747)
- Children: 6, including Charles Francis Sheridan; Richard Brinsley Sheridan; Alicia Sheridan Lefanu; Betsy Sheridan

Frances Sheridan (née Chamberlaine; 1724 – 26 September 1766) was an Anglo-Irish novelist and playwright.

== Life ==
Frances Chamberlaine was born in Dublin, Ireland. Her father, Dr. Phillip Chamberlaine, was an Anglican minister. In 1747 she married Thomas Sheridan, who was then an actor and theatre director, and at the same time she began work on her first novel, Eugenia and Adelaide. The couple moved to London in 1758 for business reasons (after an earlier sortie to London in 1754). In London Frances was introduced to Samuel Richardson, who encouraged her in her writing. Her most successful novel, Memoirs of Miss Sidney Bidulph (1761), in diary format, was influenced by Samuel Richardson's Pamela, or Virtue Rewarded. She turned to drama, and two of her plays were produced at London's Drury Lane theatre by David Garrick's company in the 1760s.

Frances Sheridan was the mother of Charles Francis Sheridan and the playwright Richard Brinsley Sheridan; Richard's early successful plays were much influenced by his mother's plays. Frances and Thomas Sheridan had another son, Sackville Sheridan, who lived two months after his birth in 1754. Frances Sheridan's daughter, Alicia Sheridan Lefanu (1753–1817), wrote a play, Sons of Erin, which was produced in London in 1812. Sheridan's second daughter, Anne Elizabeth Sheridan Lefanu (1756–1837) wrote as well, and some of her journals were published in 1960 as Betsy Sheridan's Journal, Letters from Sheridan's sister, 1784–1786 and 1788–1790. Frances Sheridan died at age 42 in Blois, France. Her oriental tale, The History of Nourjahad, and her sequel to The Memoirs of Miss Sidney Biddulph, were published posthumously.

A book-length biography of Frances Sheridan, Memoirs of the Life and Writings of Mrs. Frances Sheridan, was published in 1824, written by her granddaughter, Alicia LeFanu.

== Works ==
=== Plays ===
- The Discovery (1763)
- The Dupe (1764)
- A Trip to Bath (1765)

=== Novels ===
- Memoirs of Miss Sidney Bidulph (1761)
- The History of Nourjahad (1767)
- Conclusion of the Memoirs (1767)
- Eugenia and Adelaide (unpublished until 1791)
