= Nicola LeFanu =

British composer and academic (b.1947)

Nicola Frances LeFanu (born 28 April 1947) is a British composer, academic, lecturer and director.

== Life ==
Nicola LeFanu was born in Wickham Bishops, Essex, England, to William LeFanu and Elizabeth Maconchy (also a composer, later Dame Elizabeth Maconchy). She studied at St Hilda's College, Oxford, before taking up a Harkness Fellowship at Harvard. In 1972 she won the Mendelssohn Scholarship. She later became Director of Music at St Paul's Girls' School (1975–77), taught at King's College London (1977–1995, as Lecturer, Senior Lecturer and Professor), and was then a Professor of Music at the University of York, where she was Head of Department from 1994 to 2001. She retired from teaching in 2008.

In 1979 she married the composer David Lumsdaine.

She earned a Doctorate in Music from the University of London in 1988 and holds honorary doctorates from the Universities of Durham and Aberdeen and from the Open University. She is active in many aspects of the musical profession, as composer, teacher and director.

== Works ==
LeFanu has written around sixty works, including music for orchestra, chamber groups and voices (including four string quartets), and six operas. Her music is published by Chester Novello and Edition Peters.

Opera

- Dawnpath, a chamber opera (1977),
- The Story of Mary O'Neill, a radio opera (1986)
- The Green Children, a children's opera to a libretto by Kevin Crossley-Holland (1990), based on the Green children of Woolpit
- Blood Wedding (1992, libretto by Debra Levy after Federico García Lorca)
- The Wildman, another collaboration with Crossley-Holland, commissioned by the Aldeburgh Foundation and first performed in June 1995
- Light Passing (libretto by John Edmonds, BBC/NCEM, York, 2004), which played to sellout audiences and received critical acclaim
- Dream Hunter (libretto by John Fuller, 2010)

Orchestral

- The Hidden Landscape (1973)
- Columbia Falls (1975)
- Saxophone Concerto (1989)
- Concertino for chamber orchestra (1997)
- Amores for solo horn and string orchestra (2003)
- Threnody (2015)
- The Crimson Bird (2016) (Text from the poem Siege by John Fuller)

Chamber

- Catena for eleven solo strings (2001)
- Echo and Narcissus for two pianos
- Invisible Places for clarinet and string quartet (1986)
- Moon Over The Western Ridge, Mootwingee for saxophone quartet (1985)
- Piano Trio (2003)
- Sextet (1986)
- Songs without Words for clarinet and string trio (2005)
- Songs for Jane for soprano and viola (2005), "written for my cousin Jane Darwin" and dedicated "for Carola to sing to Jane"
- String Quartet No 1 (1988)
- String Quartet No 2 (1997)
- String Quartet No 3 (2010)
- String Quartet No 4, premiered by the Bingham String Quartet in York, 2 September 2016.
- String Quartet No 5 (2022)

== Recordings ==
Recordings of four orchestral pieces - The Crimson Bird, The Hidden Landscape, Columbia Falls and Threnody - were issued by NMC in 2020. A collection of her chamber music by Gemini, issued in 2024, includes The Same Day Dawns (1974, for soprano and five instruments), The Moth Ghost (2020 for soprano and piano), the Sextet (1996) and the Piano Trio (2003). Gemini also recorded Invisible Places and Songs Without Words in 2017.
