= Dorothy Gow =

English composer

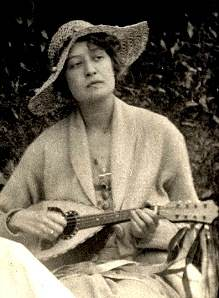
Dorothy Gow

Dorothy Alice Gow (30 November 1892 – 1 November 1982) was an English composer. She was born in London, the youngest of six children from a Scottish family. The Music Society performed her works as early as 1922, and after this initial success, Gow began studying at the Royal College of Music when she was in her thirties. Gow was living at 184 Earls Court Road at the time of the 1901 census. She studied composition with Vaughan Williams at the Royal College of Music and with Egon Wellesz in Vienna. She never married and died in London.

== Works ==
Selected works include:

- String Quartet in One Movement (1947)
- Oboe Quintet (1936)

Her works have been recorded and issued on CD, including:

- An English Renaissance Audio CD (2004) Oboe Classics
