= Thomas Sheridan (actor) =

Irish stage actor and educator (1719–1788)

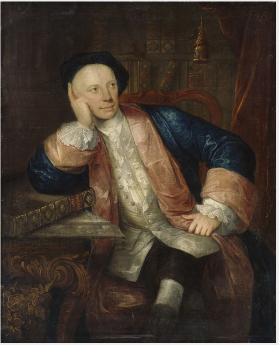
- Portrait by John Lewis, 1753
- Born: c. 1719; Either Dublin or Quilca, County Cavan, Ireland
- Died: 14 August 1788 (age about 69); Margate, England
- Education: Trinity College Dublin
- Spouse: Frances Sheridan (m. 1747; died 1766)
- Children: 6, including: Charles Francis Sheridan; Richard Brinsley Sheridan; Alicia Sheridan Le Fanu; Betsy Sheridan
- Father: Thomas Sheridan

Thomas Sheridan (c. 1719 – 14 August 1788) was an Irish actor, theatre manager, orthoepist and major proponent of the elocution movement.

== Life ==
Sheridan was born around 1719 in either Dublin or Quilca, County Cavan to Thomas Sheridan, a schoolmaster and Church of Ireland clergyman, and Elizabeth MacFadden. One of nine siblings, Sheridan was the Godson of his father's close friend Jonathan Swift. His parents' marriage was notoriously unhappy, and they lived apart much of the time. Thomas attended Westminster School in 1732–1733 but, because of his father's financial problems, he had to finish his initial education in Dublin. In 1739, he earned his BA from Trinity College Dublin and he went on to earn his MA from Trinity in the early 1740s.

== Career ==
He had his début in acting when he played the title role in Shakespeare's Richard III in Dublin. Soon after, he was noted as the most popular actor in Ireland, being compared often with David Garrick. Not only an actor, but he also wrote The Brave Irishman or Captain O'Blunder which premièred in 1738. He became the manager of the Dublin theatre sometime in the 1740s.

Sheridan left his acting career, although he continued to manage theatre companies and occasionally play bit parts, and moved permanently to England with his family in 1758. There, his time was spent as a teacher and an educator offering a very successful lecture course. In 1762 Sheridan published Lectures on Elocution. Following that work, he published A Plan of Education (1769), Lectures on the Art of Reading (1775), and A General Dictionary of the English Language (1780). Each of these works was based on some form of an argument taken in an earlier work British Education: Or, The source of the Disorders of Great Britain. Being an Essay towards proving, that the Immorality, Ignorance, and false Taste, which so generally prevail, are the natural and necessary Consequences of the present to defective System of Education. With an attempt to shew, that a revival of the Art of Speaking, and the Study of Our Own Language, might contribute, in a great measure, to the Cure of those Evils (1756).

He lived in London for a number of years before moving to Bath where he founded an academy for the regular instruction of Young Gentlemen in the art of reading and reciting and grammatical knowledge of the English tongue. This venture apparently proving to be unsuccessful, he returned to Dublin and the theatre in 1771. Thomas's son Richard became a partial owner of the Theatre Royal in London in 1776. Two years later Thomas was appointed manager of the theatre, a position he held until 1781. In 1780, Sheridan published a "respelled" dictionary of the English language. His work is very noticeable in the writings of Hugh Blair.

== Beliefs ==
Sheridan attempted to supply the willing student with a guide to public speaking that was correct, appropriate, and successful. What he actually wanted was a total reform of the British education system, as he saw it disregarding elocution and/or rhetorical delivery. In his work British Education, Sheridan claimed that poor preaching was negatively affecting religion itself.

Sheridan's belief in the valuable effects of strong and correct public speaking was so strong that he was sure studying elocution would help ensure perfection in all of the arts. In British Education, Sheridan writes that preaching from the pulpit "must either effectually support religion against all opposition, or be the principal means of its destruction".

Convinced that English preaching was not done as well as it should be, Sheridan focused on delivery as the principal avenue toward delivering effective messages to an audience: "Before you can persuade a man into any opinion, he must first be convinced that you believe it yourself. This he can never be, unless the tones of voice in which you speak come from the heart, accompanied by corresponding looks, and gestures, which naturally result from a man who speaks in earnest." Sheridan believed that elocution was not restricted to the voice, but embodied the entire person with facial expressions, gestures, posture, and movement.

== A Course of Lectures on Elocution ==
Published in 1762, this work is considered by many to be Sheridan's most well-known. He established a niche for his insights through decrying the current state of public speaking, as he often did: "so low is the state of elocution amongst us, that a man who is master even of these rudiments of rhetoric, is comparatively considered, as one of excellent delivery". Besides establishing the points previously mentioned, the quote also offers a more narrow definition of rhetoric that seems to be influenced by Peter Ramus.

Central to Sheridan's work was his emphasis on the importance of tones to eloquence. These tones, which correlated with the expressive effects one can give to their speaking, were something Sheridan considered an important part of persuasion. He stated, "The tones expressive of sorrow, lamentation, mirth, joy, hatred, anger, love, &c. are the same in all nations, and consequently can excite emotions in us analogous to those passions, when accompanying words which we do not understand: nay the very tones themselves, independent of words, will produce the same effects". For Sheridan, how a message was communicated was apparently as important as the message itself. He uses the example of someone saying in a calm demeanour, "My rage is rouzed to a pitch of frenzy, I can not command it: Avoid me, be gone this moment, or I shall tear you to pieces" to show the importance of tones to a message.

Because of this, Sheridan set out to address what he thought John Locke had left out in his treatment of language: "(t)he nobler branch of language, which consists of the signs of internal emotions, was untouched by him as foreign to his purpose".

== Personal life ==
In 1747, Sheridan married the novelist and playwright Frances Sheridan. The couple had six children, including the writers and politicians Charles Francis Sheridan and Richard Brinsley Sheridan, and the writers Alicia Sheridan Le Fanu and Betsy Sheridan. The couple's eldest son, Thomas, died aged 3 and their fifth child, Sackville, died in infancy.

On 14 August 1788, Sheridan died in Margate whilst en route to Portugal.

== Selected plays ==
- Captain O'Blunder

== Bibliography ==
- Lee, Sidney, ed. (1897). "Sheridan, Thomas (1719-1788)". Dictionary of National Biography. Vol. 52. London: Smith, Elder & Co.
- Bizzell, Patricia, and Bruce Herzberg, eds. The Rhetorical Tradition. 2nd ed. Boston: Bedford/St. Martin's, 2001.
- Howell, Wilbur Samuel. Eighteenth-Century British Logic and Rhetoric. Princeton, NJ: Princeton University Press, 1971.
