= Science in the Enlightenment =

Science during the 16th-19th century

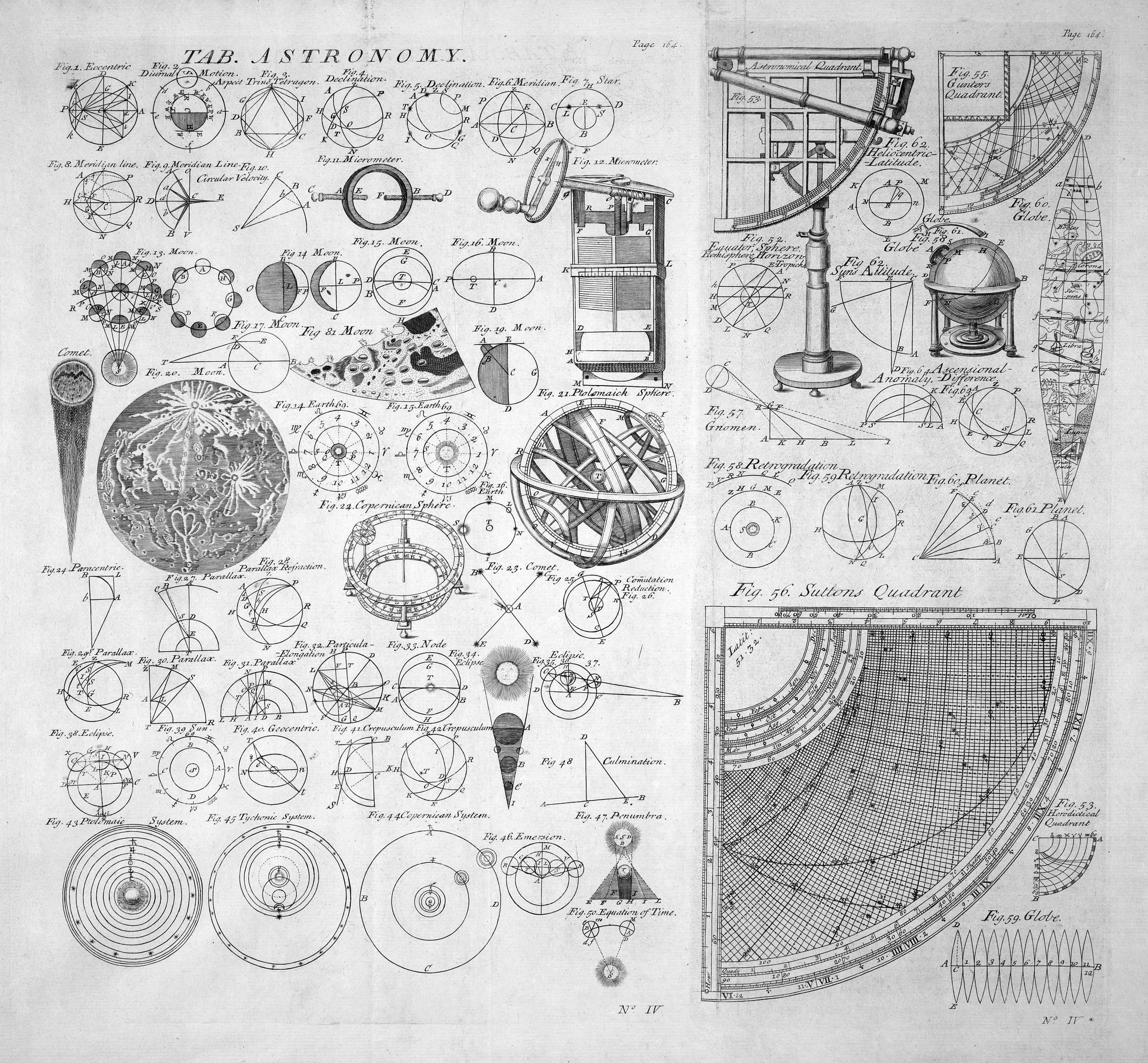
Table of astronomy, from the 1728 Cyclopaedia

The history of science during the Enlightenment traces developments in science and technology as Enlightenment ideas and ideals were being disseminated across Europe and North America. Generally, the period spans from the final days of the 16th- and 17th-century Scientific Revolution until roughly the 19th century, after the French Revolution (1789) and the Napoleonic era (1799–1815). The scientific revolution saw the creation of the first scientific societies, the rise of Copernicanism, and the displacement of Aristotelian natural philosophy and Galen's ancient medical doctrine. By the 18th century, scientific authority began to displace religious authority, and the disciplines of alchemy and astrology lost scientific credibility.

While the Enlightenment cannot be pigeonholed into a specific doctrine or set of dogmas, science came to play a leading role in Enlightenment discourse and thought. Many Enlightenment writers and thinkers had backgrounds in the sciences and associated scientific advancement with the overthrow of religion and traditional authority in favour of the development of free speech and thought. Broadly speaking, Enlightenment science greatly valued empiricism and rational thought, and was embedded with the Enlightenment ideal of advancement and progress. As with most Enlightenment views, the benefits of science were not seen universally; Jean-Jacques Rousseau criticized the sciences for distancing man from nature and not operating to make people happier.

Science during the Enlightenment was dominated by scientific societies and academies, which had largely replaced universities as centres of scientific research and development. Societies and academies were also the backbone of the maturation of the scientific profession. Another important development was the popularization of science among an increasingly literate population. Philosophes introduced the public to many scientific theories, most notably through the Encyclopédie and the popularization of Newtonianism by Voltaire as well as by Émilie du Châtelet, the French translator of Newton's Philosophiæ Naturalis Principia Mathematica. Some historians have marked the 18th century as a drab period in the history of science; however, the century saw significant advancements in the practice of medicine, mathematics, and physics; the development of biological taxonomy; a new understanding of magnetism and electricity; and the maturation of chemistry as a discipline, which established the foundations of modern chemistry.

== Universities ==
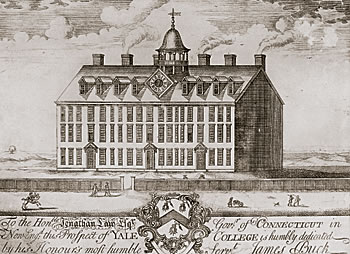
The original building at Yale, 1718–1782

The number of universities in Paris remained relatively constant throughout the 18th century. Europe had about 105 universities and colleges by 1700. North America had 44, including the newly founded Harvard and Yale. The number of university students remained roughly the same throughout the Enlightenment in most Western nations, excluding Britain, where the number of institutions and students increased. University students were generally males from affluent families, seeking a career in either medicine, law, or the Church. The universities themselves existed primarily to educate future physicians, lawyers and members of the clergy.

The study of science under the heading of natural philosophy was divided into physics and a conglomerate grouping of chemistry and natural history, which included anatomy, biology, geology, mineralogy, and zoology. Most European universities taught a Cartesian form of mechanical philosophy in the early 18th century, and only slowly adopted Newtonianism in the mid-18th century. A notable exception were universities in Spain, which under the influence of Catholicism focused almost entirely on Aristotelian natural philosophy until the mid-18th century; they were among the last universities to do so. Another exception occurred in the universities of Germany and Scandinavia, where University of Halle professor Christian Wolff taught a form of Cartesianism modified by Leibnizian physics.

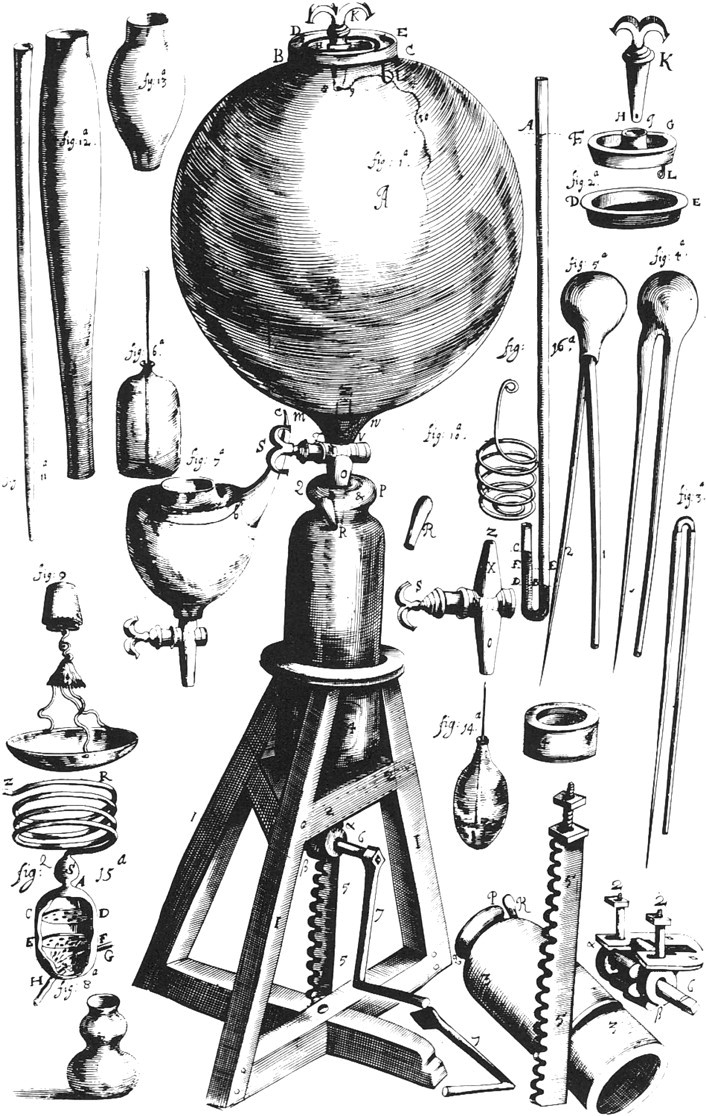
Robert Boyle's air-pump, used in the demonstration lectures of Pierre Polinière

Before the 18th century, science courses were taught almost exclusively through formal lectures. The structure of courses began to change in the first decades of the 18th century, when physical demonstrations were added to lectures. Pierre Polinière and Jacques Rohault were among the first individuals to provide demonstrations of physical principles in the classroom. Experiments ranged from swinging a bucket of water at the end of a rope, demonstrating that centrifugal force would hold the water in the bucket, to more impressive experiments involving the use of an air-pump. One particularly dramatic air-pump demonstration involved placing an apple inside the glass receiver of the air-pump, and removing air until the resulting vacuum caused the apple to explode. Polinière's demonstrations were so impressive that he was granted an invitation to present his course to Louis XV in 1722.

Some attempts at reforming the structure of the science curriculum were made during the 18th century and the first decades of the 19th century. Beginning around 1745, the Hats party in Sweden made propositions to reform the university system by separating natural philosophy into two separate faculties of physics and mathematics. The propositions were never put into action, but they represent the growing calls for institutional reform in the later part of the 18th century. In 1777, the study of arts at Kraków and Vilna in Poland was divided into the two new faculties of moral philosophy and physics. However, the reform did not survive beyond 1795 and the Third Partition. During the French Revolution, all colleges and universities in France were abolished and reformed in 1808 under the single institution of the Université imperiale. The Université divided the arts and sciences into separate faculties, something that had never before been done before in Europe. The United Kingdom of the Netherlands employed the same system in 1815. However, the other countries of Europe did not adopt a similar division of the faculties until the mid-19th century.

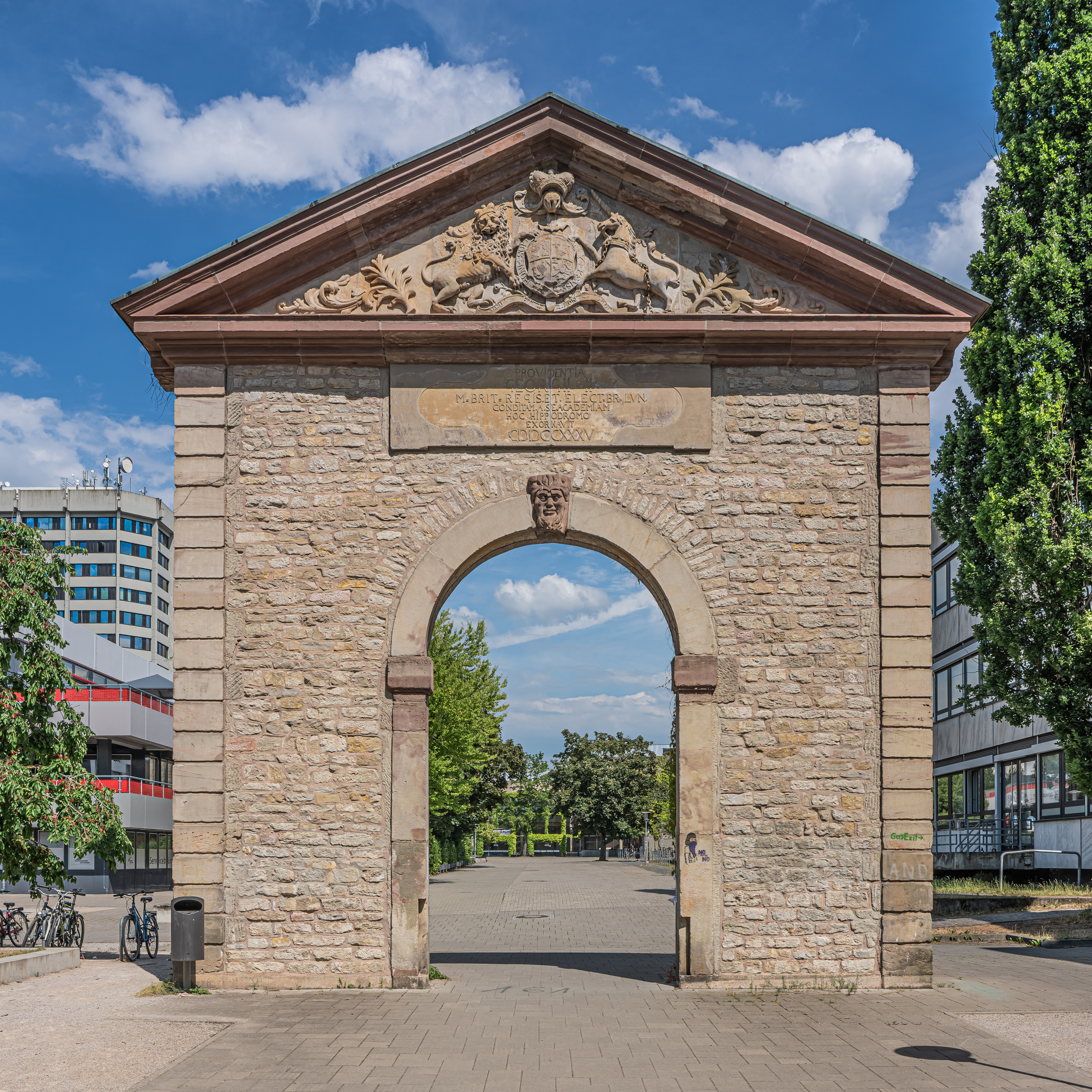
The old entrance to the University of Göttingen

Universities in France tended to serve a downplayed role in the development of science during the Enlightenment; that role was dominated by the scientific academies, such as the French Academy of Sciences. The contributions of universities in Britain were mixed. On the one hand, the University of Cambridge began teaching Newtonianism early in the Enlightenment, but failed to become a central force behind the advancement of science. On the other end of the spectrum were Scottish universities, which had strong medical faculties and became centres of scientific development. Under Frederick II, German universities began to promote the sciences. Christian Wolff's unique blend of Cartesian-Leibnizian physics began to be adopted in universities outside of Halle. The University of Göttingen, founded in 1734, was far more liberal than its counterparts, allowing professors to plan their own courses and select their own textbooks. Göttingen also emphasized research and publication. A further influential development in German universities was the abandonment of Latin in favour of the German vernacular.

In the 17th century, the Netherlands had played a significant role in the advancement of the sciences, including Isaac Beeckman's mechanical philosophy and Christiaan Huygens' work on the calculus and in astronomy. Professors at universities in the Dutch Republic were among the first to adopt Newtonianism. From the University of Leiden, Willem 's Gravesande's students went on to spread Newtonianism to Harderwijk and Franeker, among other Dutch universities, and also to the University of Amsterdam.

While the number of universities did not dramatically increase during the Enlightenment, new private and public institutions added to the provision of education. Most of the new institutions emphasized mathematics as a discipline, making them popular with professions that required some working knowledge of mathematics, such as merchants, military and naval officers, and engineers. Universities, on the other hand, maintained their emphasis on the classics, Greek, and Latin, encouraging the popularity of the new institutions with individuals who had not been formally educated.

== Societies and Academies ==
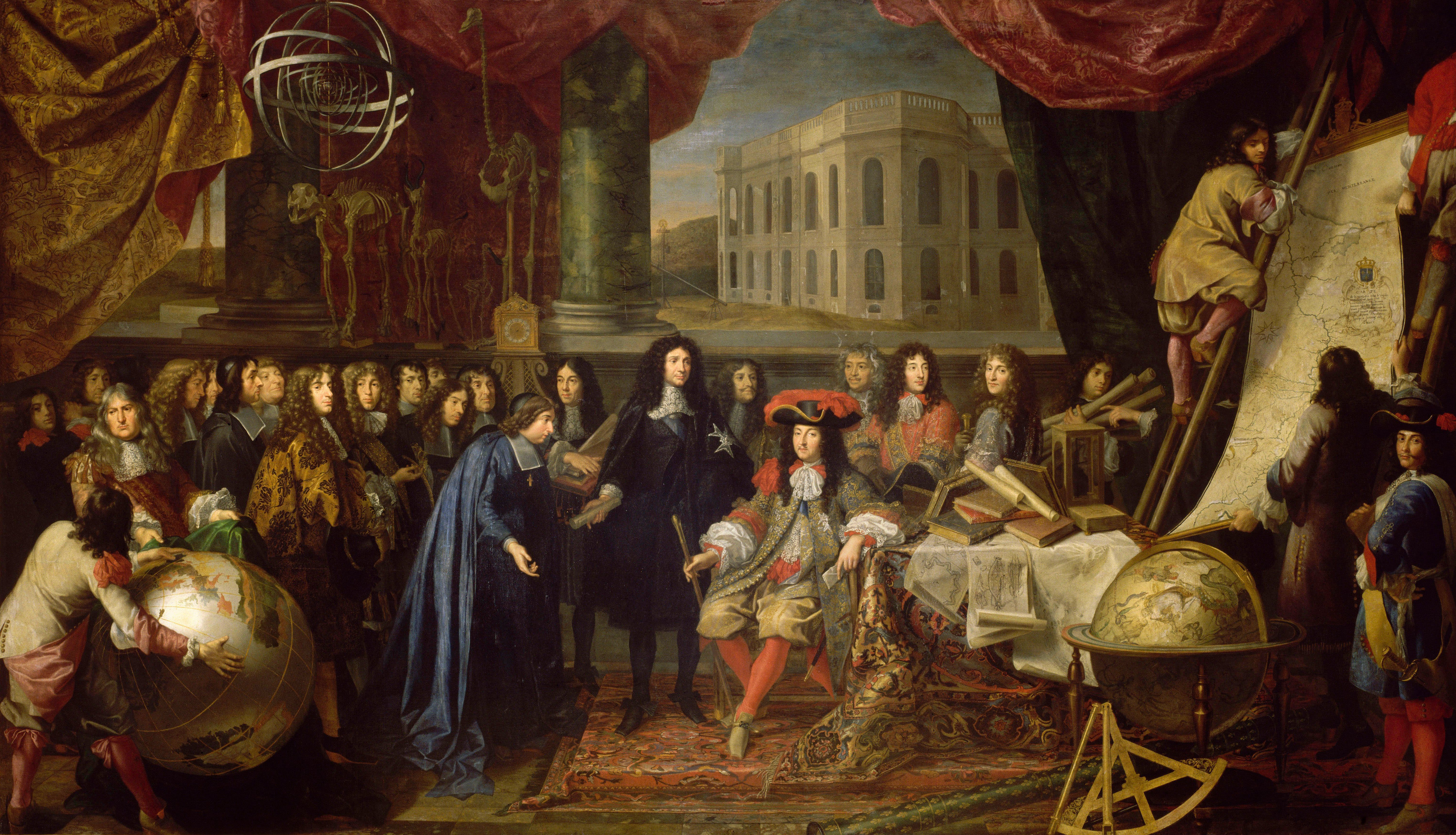
Members of the Académie des sciences with Louis XIV in 1667; in the background appears the new Paris Observatory.

Scientific academies and societies grew out of the Scientific Revolution as the creators of scientific knowledge in contrast to the scholasticism of the university. During the Enlightenment, some societies created or retained links to universities. However, contemporary sources distinguished universities from scientific societies by claiming that the university's utility was in the transmission of knowledge, while societies functioned to create knowledge. As the role of universities in institutionalized science began to diminish, learned societies became the cornerstone of organized science. After 1700 a tremendous number of official academies and societies were founded in Europe and by 1789 there were over seventy official scientific societies . In reference to this growth, Bernard de Fontenelle coined the term "the Age of Academies" to describe the 18th century.

National scientific societies were founded throughout the Enlightenment era in the urban hotbeds of scientific development across Europe. In the 17th century the Royal Society of London (1662), the Paris Académie Royale des Sciences (1666), and the Berlin Akademie der Wissenschaften (1700) were founded. Around the start of the 18th century, the Academia Scientiarum Imperialis (1724) in St. Petersburg, and the Kungliga Vetenskapsakademien (Royal Swedish Academy of Sciences) (1739) were created. Regional and provincial societies emerged from the 18th century in Bologna, Bordeaux, Copenhagen, Dijon, Lyons, Montpellier and Uppsala. Following this initial period of growth, societies were founded between 1752 and 1785 in Barcelona, Brussels, Dublin, Edinburgh, Göttingen, Mannheim, Munich, Padua and Turin. The development of unchartered societies, such as the private the Naturforschende Gesellschaft of Danzig (1743) and Lunar Society of Birmingham (1766–1791), occurred alongside the growth of national, regional and provincial societies.

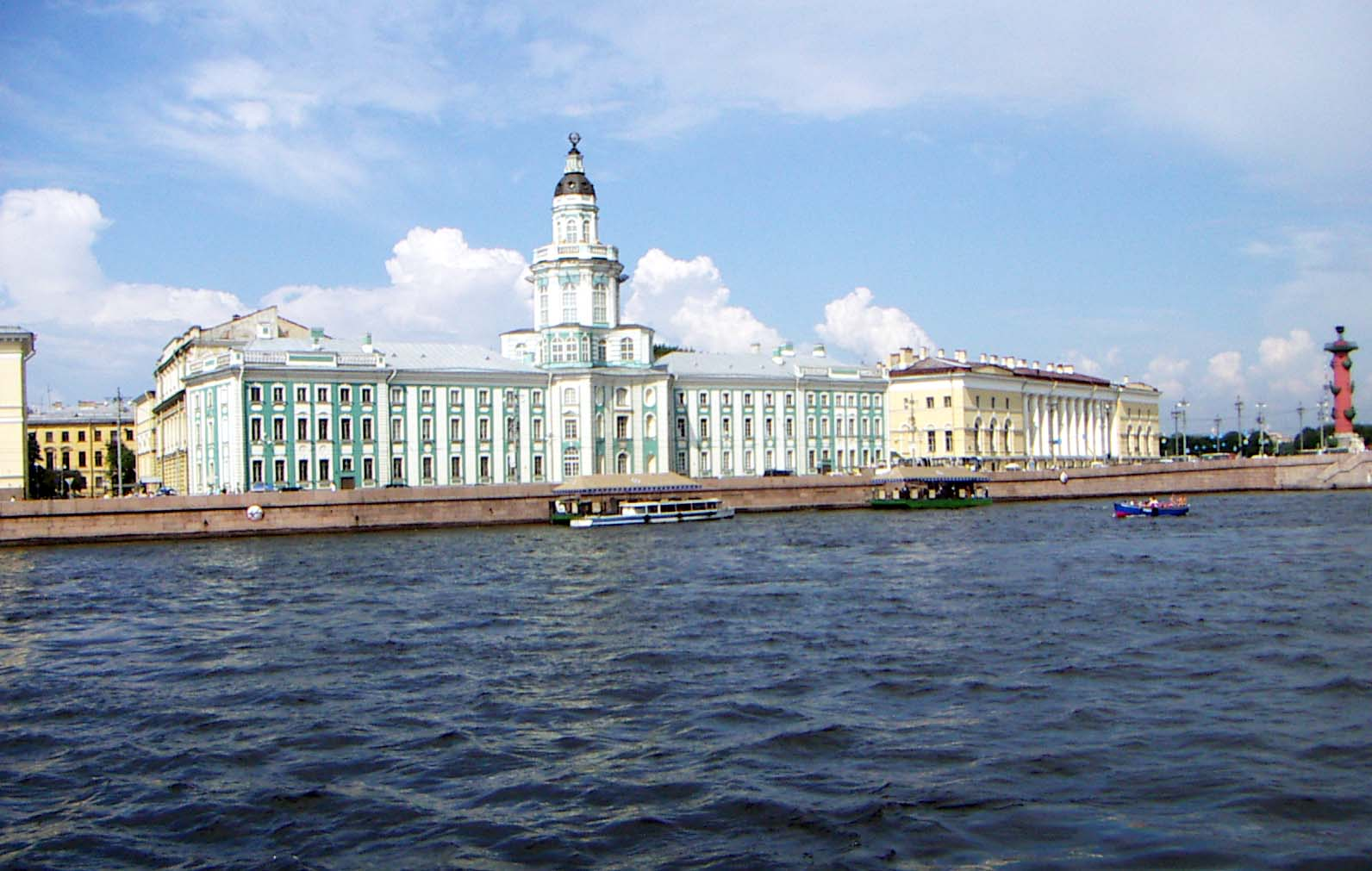
Original headquarters of the Imperial Academy of Sciences – the Kunstkammer in Saint Petersburg

Official scientific societies were chartered by the state in order to provide technical expertise. This advisory capacity offered scientific societies the most direct contact between the scientific community and government bodies available during the Enlightenment. State sponsorship was beneficial to the societies as it brought finance and recognition, along with a measure of freedom in management. Most societies were granted permission to oversee their own publications, control the election of new members, and the administration of the society. Membership in academies and societies was therefore highly selective. In some societies, members were required to pay an annual fee to participate. For example, the Royal Society depended on contributions from its members, which excluded a wide range of artisans and mathematicians on account of the expense. Society activities included research, experimentation, sponsoring essay prize contests, and collaborative projects between societies. A dialogue of formal communication also developed between societies and society in general through the publication of scientific journals. Periodicals offered society members the opportunity to publish, and for their ideas to be consumed by other scientific societies and the literate public. Scientific journals, readily accessible to members of learned societies, became the most important form of publication for scientists during the Enlightenment.

== Periodicals ==
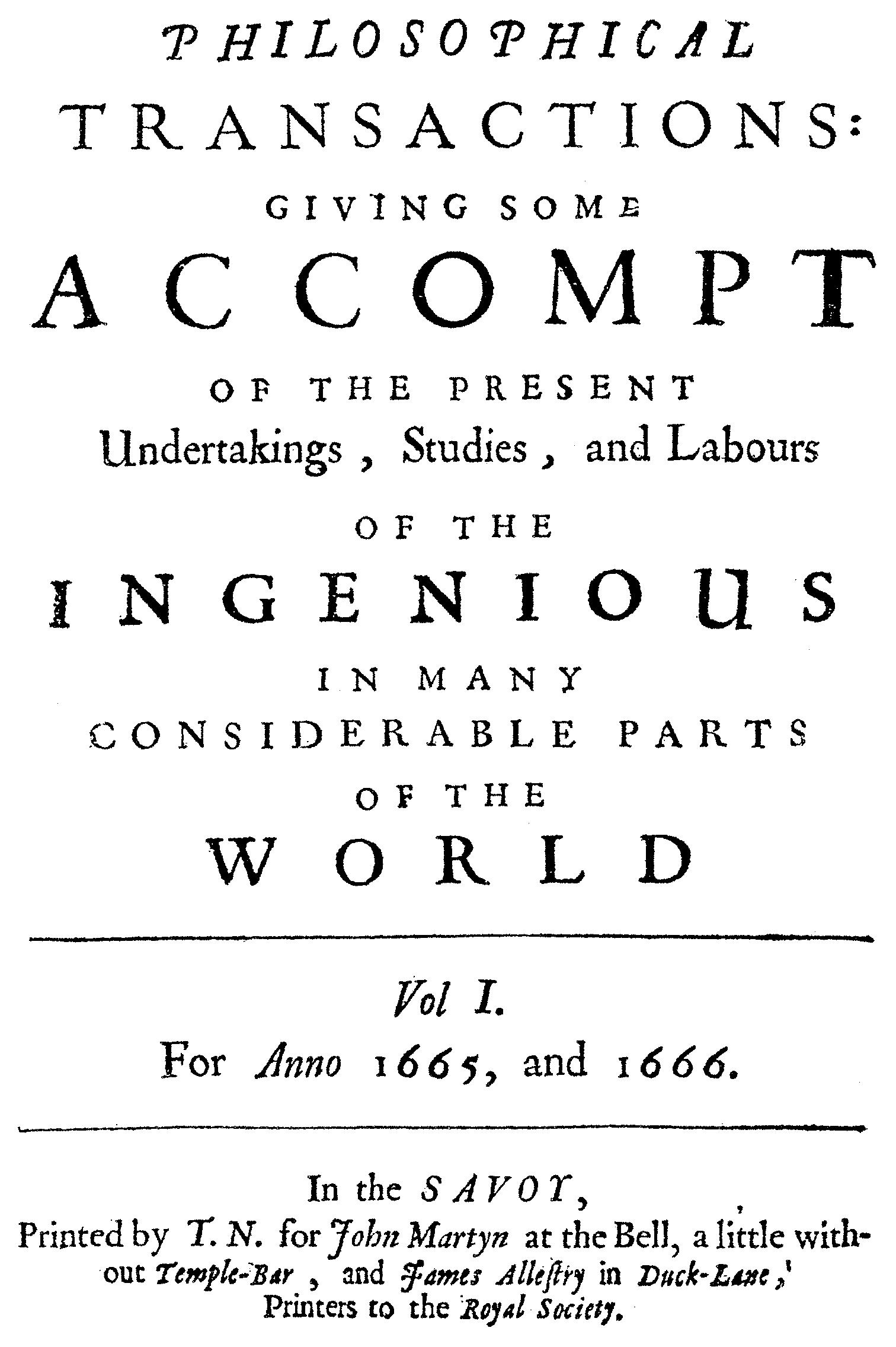
Cover of the first volume of Philosophical Transactions of the Royal Society, 1665–1666

Academies and societies served to disseminate Enlightenment science by publishing the scientific works of their members, as well as their proceedings. At the beginning of the 18th century, the Philosophical Transactions of the Royal Society, published by the Royal Society of London, was the only scientific periodical being published on a regular, quarterly basis. The Paris Academy of Sciences, formed in 1666, began publishing in volumes of memoirs rather than a quarterly journal, with periods between volumes sometimes lasting years. While some official periodicals may have published more frequently, there was still a long delay from a paper's submission for review to its actual publication. Smaller periodicals, such as Transactions of the American Philosophical Society, were only published when enough content was available to complete a volume. At the Paris Academy, there was an average delay of three years for publication. At one point the period extended to seven years. The Paris Academy processed submitted articles through the Comité de Librarie, which had the final word on what would or would not be published. In 1703, the mathematician Antoine Parent began a periodical, Researches in Physics and Mathematics, specifically to publish papers that had been rejected by the Comité.

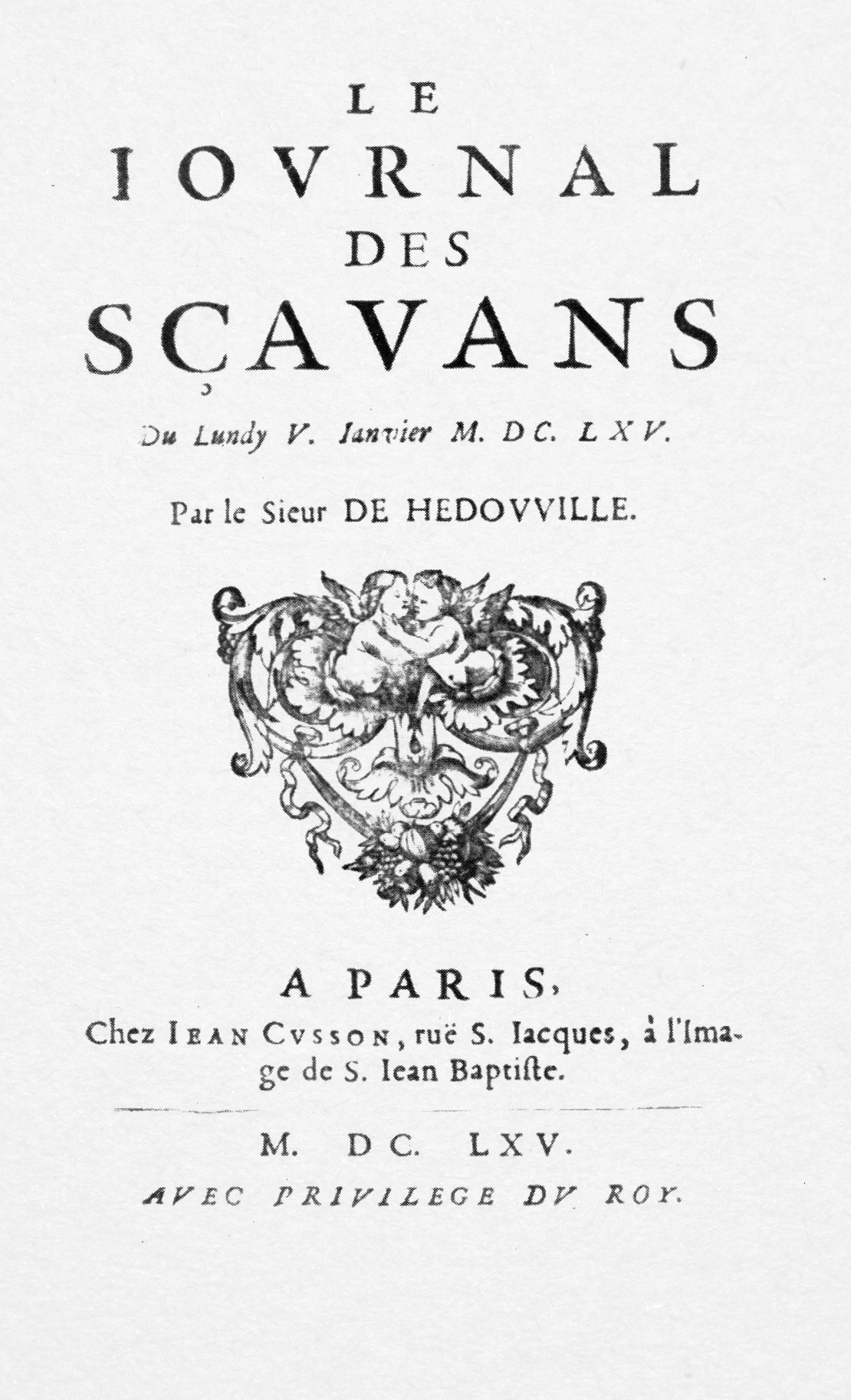
The first issue of the Journal des sçavans

The limitations of such academic journals left considerable space for the rise of independent periodicals. Some eminent examples include Johann Ernst Immanuel Walch's Der Naturforscher (The Natural Investigator) (1725–1778), Journal des sçavans (1665–1792), the Jesuit Mémoires de Trévoux (1701–1779), and Leibniz's Acta Eruditorum (Reports/Acts of the Scholars) (1682–1782). Independent periodicals were published throughout the Enlightenment and excited scientific interest in the general public. While the journals of the academies primarily published scientific papers, independent periodicals were a mix of reviews, abstracts, translations of foreign texts, and sometimes derivative, reprinted materials. Most of these texts were published in the local vernacular, so their continental spread depended on the language of the readers. For example, in 1761 Russian scientist Mikhail Lomonosov correctly attributed the ring of light around Venus, visible during the planet's transit, as the planet's atmosphere; however, because few scientists understood Russian outside of Russia, his discovery was not widely credited until 1910.

Some changes in periodicals occurred during the course of the Enlightenment. First, they increased in number and size. There was also a move away from publishing in Latin in favour of publishing in the vernacular. Experimental descriptions became more detailed and began to be accompanied by reviews. In the late 18th century, a second change occurred when a new breed of periodical began to publish monthly about new developments and experiments in the scientific community. The first of this kind of journal was François Rozier's Observations sur la physiques, sur l'histoire naturelle et sur les arts, commonly referred to as "Rozier's journal", which was first published in 1772. The journal allowed new scientific developments to be published relatively quickly compared to annuals and quarterlies. A third important change was the specialization seen in the new development of disciplinary journals. With a wider audience and ever increasing publication material, specialized journals such as Curtis' Botanical Magazine (1787) and the Annals de Chimie (1789) reflect the growing division between scientific disciplines in the Enlightenment era.

== Encyclopedias and dictionaries ==
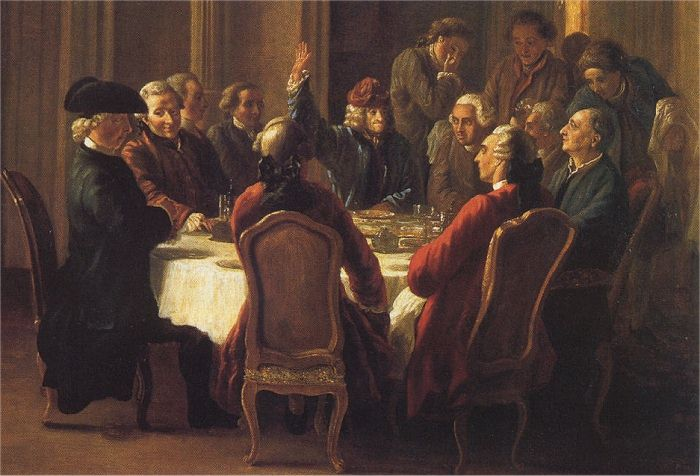
Denis Diderot with Voltaire, Jean le Rond d'Alembert and Marquis de Condorcet

Although the existence of dictionaries and encyclopedia spanned into ancient times, and would be nothing new to Enlightenment readers, the texts changed from simply defining words in a long running list to far more detailed discussions of those words in 18th-century encyclopedic dictionaries. The works were part of an Enlightenment movement to systematize knowledge and provide education to a wider audience than the educated elite. As the 18th century progressed, the content of encyclopedias also changed according to readers' tastes. Volumes tended to focus more strongly on secular affairs, particularly science and technology, rather than matters of theology.

Along with secular matters, readers also favoured an alphabetical ordering scheme over cumbersome works arranged along thematic lines. The historian Charles Porset, commenting on alphabetization, has said that "as the zero degree of taxonomy, alphabetical order authorizes all reading strategies; in this respect it could be considered an emblem of the Enlightenment." For Porset, the avoidance of thematic and hierarchical systems thus allows free interpretation of the works and becomes an example of egalitarianism. Encyclopedias and dictionaries also became more popular during the Age of Reason as the number of educated consumers who could afford such texts began to multiply. In the later half of the 18th century, the number of dictionaries and encyclopedias published by decade increased from 63 between 1760 and 1769 to approximately 148 in the decade proceeding the French Revolution (1780–1789). Along with growth in numbers, dictionaries and encyclopedias also grew in length, often having multiple print runs that sometimes included in supplemented editions.

The first technical dictionary was drafted by John Harris and entitled Lexicon Technicum: Or, An Universal English Dictionary of Arts and Sciences. Harris' book avoided theological and biographical entries; instead it concentrated on science and technology. Published in 1704, the Lexicon technicum was the first book to be written in English that took a methodical approach to describing mathematics and commercial arithmetic along with the physical sciences and navigation. Other technical dictionaries followed Harris' model, including Ephraim Chambers' Cyclopaedia (1728), which included five editions, and was a substantially larger work than Harris'. The folio edition of the work even included foldout engravings. The Cyclopaedia emphasized Newtonian theories, Lockean philosophy, and contained thorough examinations of technologies, such as engraving, brewing, and dyeing.

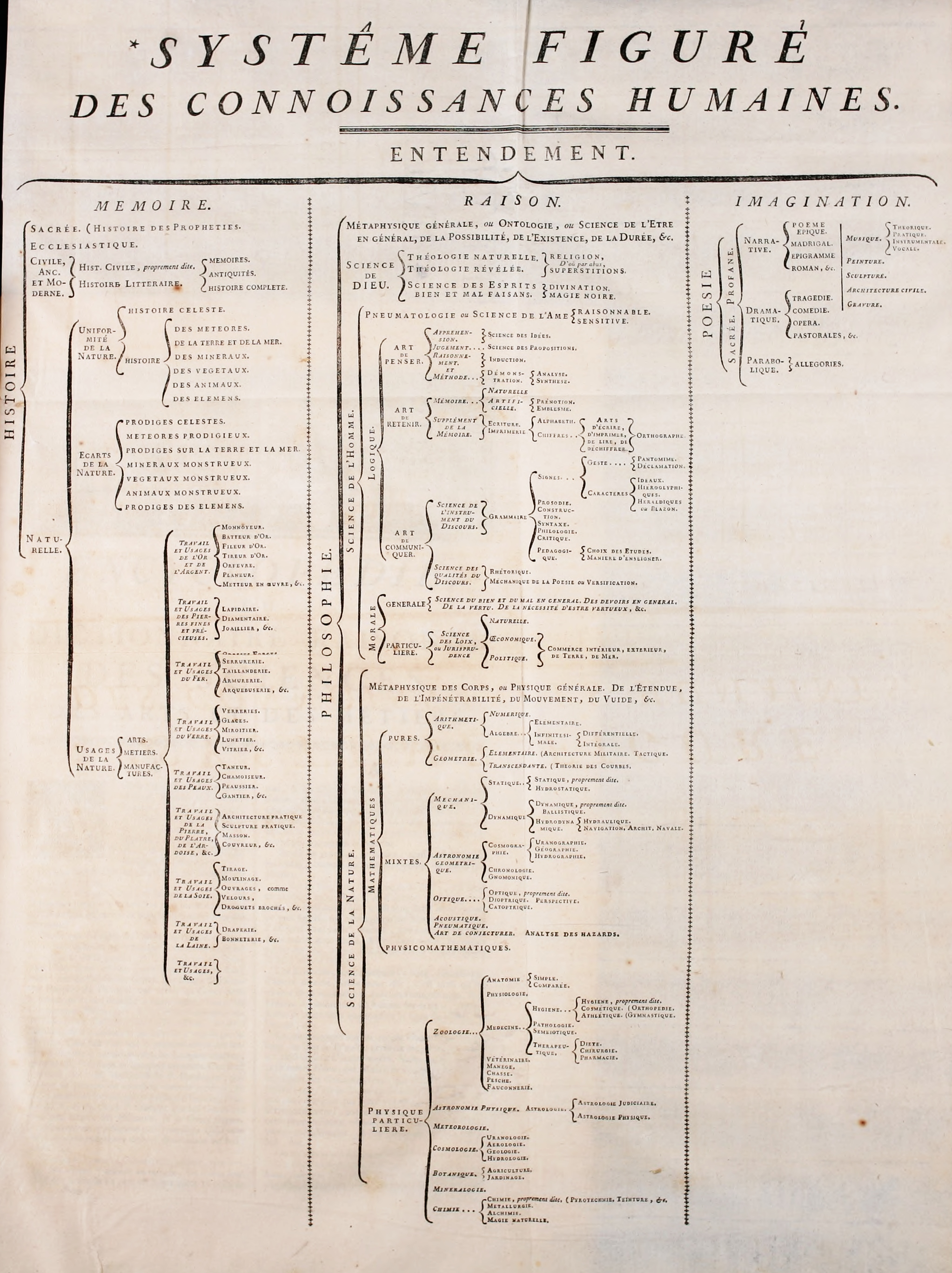
"Figurative system of human knowledge", the structure that the Encyclopédie organised knowledge into. It had three main branches: memory, reason, and imagination.

In Germany, practical reference works intended for the uneducated majority became popular in the 18th century. The Marperger Curieuses Natur-, Kunst-, Berg-, Gewerkund Handlungs-Lexicon (1712) explained terms that usefully described the trades and scientific and commercial education. Jablonksi Allgemeines Lexicon (1721) was better known than the Handlungs-Lexicon, and underscored technical subjects rather than scientific theory. For example, over five columns of text were dedicated to wine, while geometry and logic were allocated only twenty-two and seventeen lines, respectively. The first edition of the Encyclopædia Britannica (1771) was modelled along the same lines as the German lexicons.

However, the prime example of reference works that systematized scientific knowledge in the age of Enlightenment were universal encyclopedias rather than technical dictionaries. It was the goal of universal encyclopedias to record all human knowledge in a comprehensive reference work. The most well-known of these works is Denis Diderot and Jean le Rond d'Alembert's Encyclopédie, ou dictionnaire raisonné des sciences, des arts et des métiers. The work, which began publication in 1751, was composed of thirty-five volumes and over 71 000 separate entries. A great number of the entries were dedicated to describing the sciences and crafts in detail. In d'Alembert's Preliminary Discourse to the Encyclopedia of Diderot, the work's massive goal to record the extent of human knowledge in the arts and sciences is outlined:

As an Encyclopédie, it is to set forth as well as possible the order and connection of the parts of human knowledge. As a Reasoned Dictionary of the Sciences, Arts, and Trades, it is to contain the general principles that form the basis of each science and each art, liberal or mechanical, and the most essential facts that make up the body and substance of each.

The massive work was arranged according to a "tree of knowledge". The tree reflected the marked division between the arts and sciences, which was largely a result of the rise of empiricism. Both areas of knowledge were united by philosophy, or the trunk of the tree of knowledge. The Enlightenment's desacrilization of religion was pronounced in the tree's design, particularly where theology accounted for a peripheral branch, with black magic as a close neighbour. As the Encyclopédie gained popularity, it was published in quarto and octavo editions after 1777. The quarto and octavo editions were much less expensive than previous editions, making the Encyclopédie more accessible to the non-elite. Robert Darnton estimates that there were approximately 25 000 copies of the Encyclopédie in circulation throughout France and Europe before the French Revolution. The extensive, yet affordable encyclopedia came to represent the transmission of Enlightenment and scientific education to an expanding audience.

== Popularization of science ==
One of the most important developments that the Enlightenment era brought to the discipline of science was its popularization. An increasingly literate population seeking knowledge and education in both the arts and the sciences drove the expansion of print culture and the dissemination of scientific learning. The new literate population was due to a high rise in the availability of food. This enabled many people to rise out of poverty, and instead of paying more for food, they had money for education. Popularization was generally part of an overarching Enlightenment ideal that endeavoured "to make information available to the greatest number of people." As public interest in natural philosophy grew during the 18th century, public lecture courses and the publication of popular texts opened up new roads to money and fame for amateurs and scientists who remained on the periphery of universities and academies.

=== British coffeehouses ===
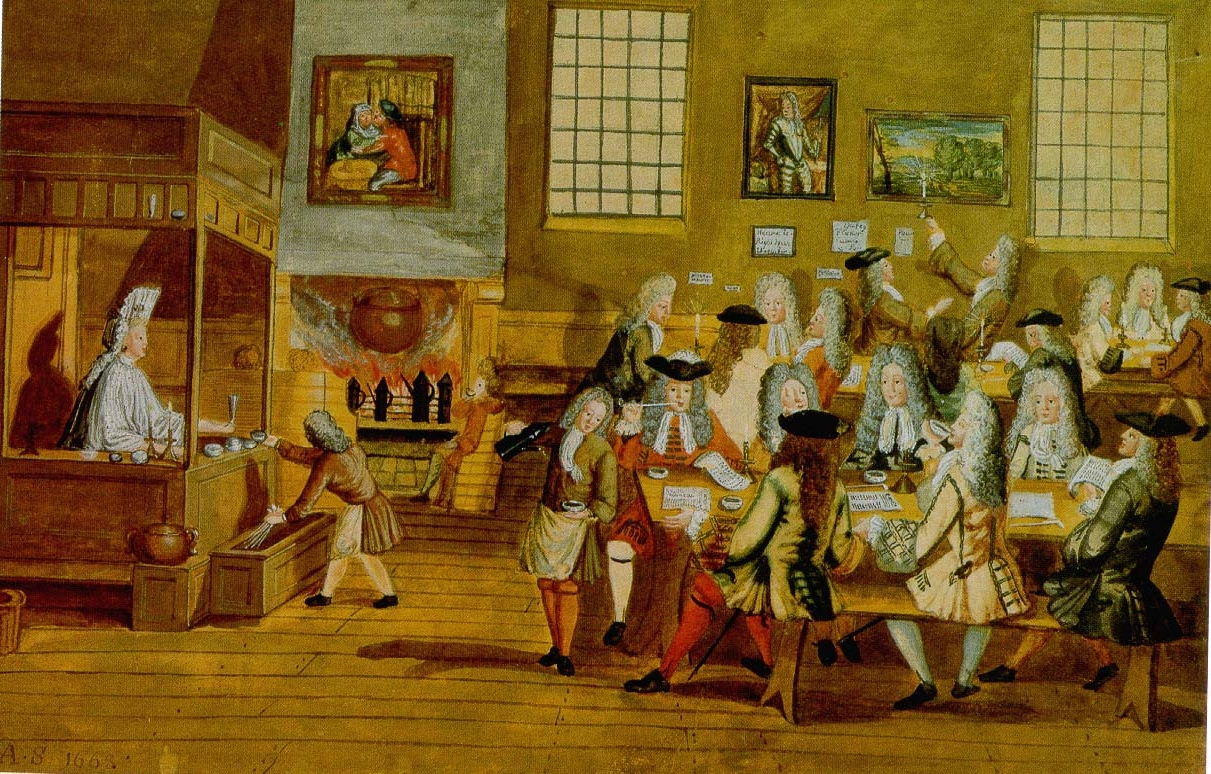
Interior of a London coffeehouse, 17th century

An early example of science emanating from the official institutions into the public realm was the British coffeehouse. With the establishment of coffeehouses, a new public forum for political, philosophical and scientific discourse was created. In the mid-16th century, coffeehouses popped up around Oxford, where the academic community began to capitalize on the unregulated conversation that the coffeehouse allowed. The new social space began to be used by some scholars as a place to discuss science and experiments outside of the laboratory of the official institution. Coffeehouse patrons were only required to purchase a dish of coffee to participate, leaving the opportunity for many, regardless of financial means, to benefit from the conversation. Education was a central theme and some patrons began offering lessons and lectures to others. The chemist Peter Staehl provided chemistry lessons at Tilliard's coffeehouse in the early 1660s. As coffeehouses developed in London, customers heard lectures on scientific subjects, such as astronomy and mathematics, for an exceedingly low price. Notable Coffeehouse enthusiasts included John Aubrey, Robert Hooke, James Brydges, and Samuel Pepys.

=== Public lectures ===
Public lecture courses offered some scientists who were unaffiliated with official organizations a forum to transmit scientific knowledge, at times even their own ideas, and the opportunity to carve out a reputation and, in some instances, a living. The public, on the other hand, gained both knowledge and entertainment from demonstration lectures. Between 1735 and 1793, there were over seventy individuals offering courses and demonstrations for public viewers in experimental physics. Class sizes ranged from one hundred to four or five hundred attendees. Courses varied in duration from one to four weeks, to a few months, or even the entire academic year. Courses were offered at virtually any time of day; the latest occurred at 8:00 or 9:00 at night. One of the most popular start times was 6:00 pm, allowing the working population to participate and signifying the attendance of the nonelite. Barred from the universities and other institutions, women were often in attendance at demonstration lectures and constituted a significant number of auditors.

The importance of the lectures was not in teaching complex mathematics or physics, but rather in demonstrating to the wider public the principles of physics and encouraging discussion and debate. Generally, individuals presenting the lectures did not adhere to any particular brand of physics, but rather demonstrated a combination of different theories. New advancements in the study of electricity offered viewers demonstrations that drew far more inspiration among the laity than scientific papers could hold. An example of a popular demonstration used by Jean-Antoine Nollet and other lecturers was the 'electrified boy'. In the demonstration, a young boy would be suspended from the ceiling, horizontal to the floor, with silk chords. An electrical machine would then be used to electrify the boy. Essentially becoming a magnet, he would then attract a collection of items scattered about him by the lecturer. Sometimes a young girl would be called from the auditors to touch or kiss the boy on the cheek, causing sparks to shoot between the two children in what was dubbed the 'electric kiss'. Such marvels would certainly have entertained the audience, but the demonstration of physical principles also served an educational purpose. One 18th-century lecturer insisted on the utility of his demonstrations, stating that they were "useful for the good of society."

=== Popular science in print ===
Increasing literacy rates in Europe during the course of the Enlightenment enabled science to enter popular culture through print. More formal works included explanations of scientific theories for individuals lacking the educational background to comprehend the original scientific text. Sir Isaac Newton's celebrated Philosophiae Naturalis Principia Mathematica was published in Latin and remained inaccessible to readers without education in the classics until Enlightenment writers began to translate and analyze the text in the vernacular. The first French introduction to Newtonianism and the Principia was Eléments de la philosophie de Newton, published by Voltaire in 1738. Émilie du Châtelet's translation of the Principia, published after her death in 1756, also helped to spread Newton's theories beyond scientific academies and the university.

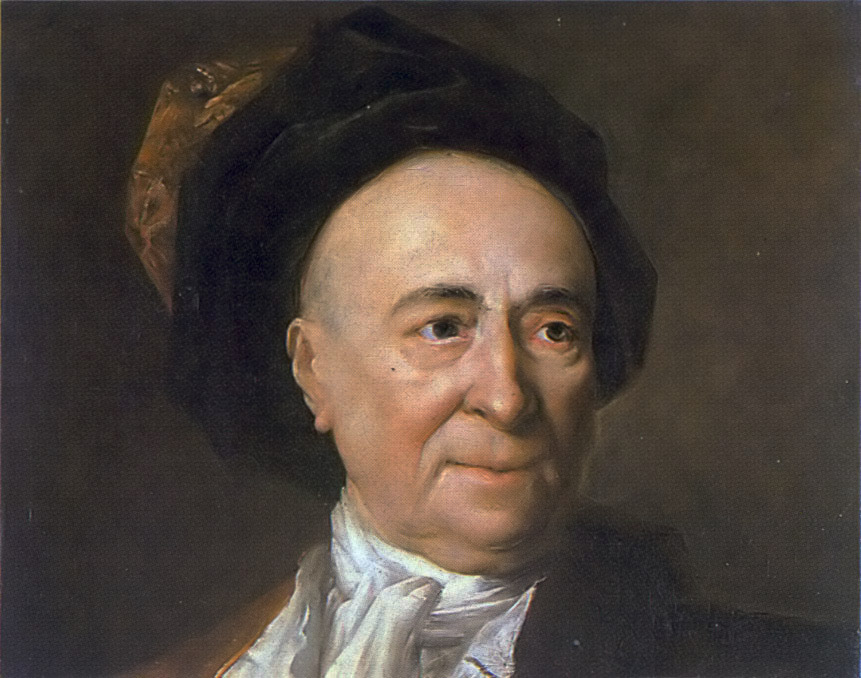
A portrait of Bernard de Fontenelle

However, science took an ever greater step towards popular culture before Voltaire's introduction and Châtelet's translation. The publication of Bernard de Fontenelle's Conversations on the Plurality of Worlds (1686) marked the first significant work that expressed scientific theory and knowledge expressly for the laity, in the vernacular, and with the entertainment of readers in mind. The book was produced specifically for women with an interest in scientific writing and inspired a variety of similar works. These popular works were written in a discursive style, which was laid out much more clearly for the reader than the complicated articles, treatises, and books published by the academies and scientists. Charles Leadbetter's Astronomy (1727) was advertised as "a Work entirely New" that would include "short and easie [sic] Rules and Astronomical Tables." Francesco Algarotti, writing for a growing female audience, published Il Newtonianism per le dame, which was a tremendously popular work and was translated from Italian into English by Elizabeth Carter. A similar introduction to Newtonianism for women was produced by Henry Pembarton. His A View of Sir Isaac Newton's Philosophy was published by subscription. Extant records of subscribers show that women from a wide range of social standings purchased the book, indicating the growing number of scientifically inclined female readers among the middling class. During the Enlightenment, women also began producing popular scientific works themselves. Sarah Trimmer wrote a successful natural history textbook for children entitled The Easy Introduction to the Knowledge of Nature (1782), which was published for many years after in eleven editions.

The influence of science also began appearing more commonly in poetry and literature during the Enlightenment. Some poetry became infused with scientific metaphor and imagery, while other poems were written directly about scientific topics. Sir Richard Blackmore committed the Newtonian system to verse in Creation, a Philosophical Poem in Seven Books (1712). After Newton's death in 1727, poems were composed in his honour for decades. James Thomson (1700–1748) penned his "Poem to the Memory of Newton," which mourned the loss of Newton, but also praised his science and legacy:

Thy swift career is with whirling orbs,
Comparing things with things in rapture loft,
And grateful adoration, for that light,
So plenteous ray'd into thy mind below.

While references to the sciences were often positive, there were some Enlightenment writers who criticized scientists for what they viewed as their obsessive, frivolous careers. Other antiscience writers, including William Blake, chastised scientists for attempting to use physics, mechanics and mathematics to simplify the complexities of the universe, particularly in relation to God. The character of the evil scientist was invoked during this period in the romantic tradition. For example, the characterization of the scientist as a nefarious manipulator in the work of Ernst Theodor Wilhelm Hoffmann.

== Women in science ==
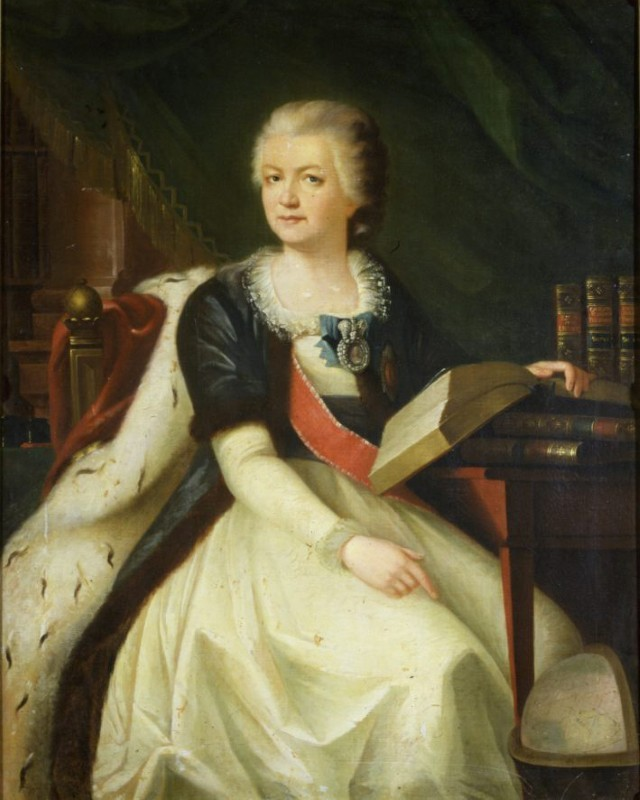
A portrait of Yekaterina Romanovna Vorontsova-Dashkova

During the Enlightenment era, women were excluded from scientific societies, universities and learned professions. Women were educated, if at all, through self-study, tutors, and by the teachings of more open-minded fathers. With the exception of daughters of craftsmen, who sometimes learned their father's profession by assisting in the workshop, learned women were primarily part of elite society. A consequence of the exclusion of women from societies and universities that prevented much independent research was their inability to access scientific instruments, such as the microscope. In fact, restrictions were so severe in the 18th century that women, including midwives, were forbidden to use forceps. That particular restriction exemplified the increasingly constrictive, male-dominated medical community. Over the course of the 18th century, male surgeons began to assume the role of midwives in gynaecology. Some male satirists also ridiculed scientifically minded women, describing them as neglectful of their domestic role. The negative view of women in the sciences reflected the sentiment apparent in some Enlightenment texts that women need not, nor ought to be educated; the opinion is exemplified by Jean-Jacques Rousseau in Émile:

A woman’s education must... be planned in relation to man. To be pleasing in his sight, to win his respect and love, to train him in childhood, to tend him in manhood, to counsel and console, to make his life pleasant and happy, these are the duties of woman for all time, and this is what she should be taught while she is young.

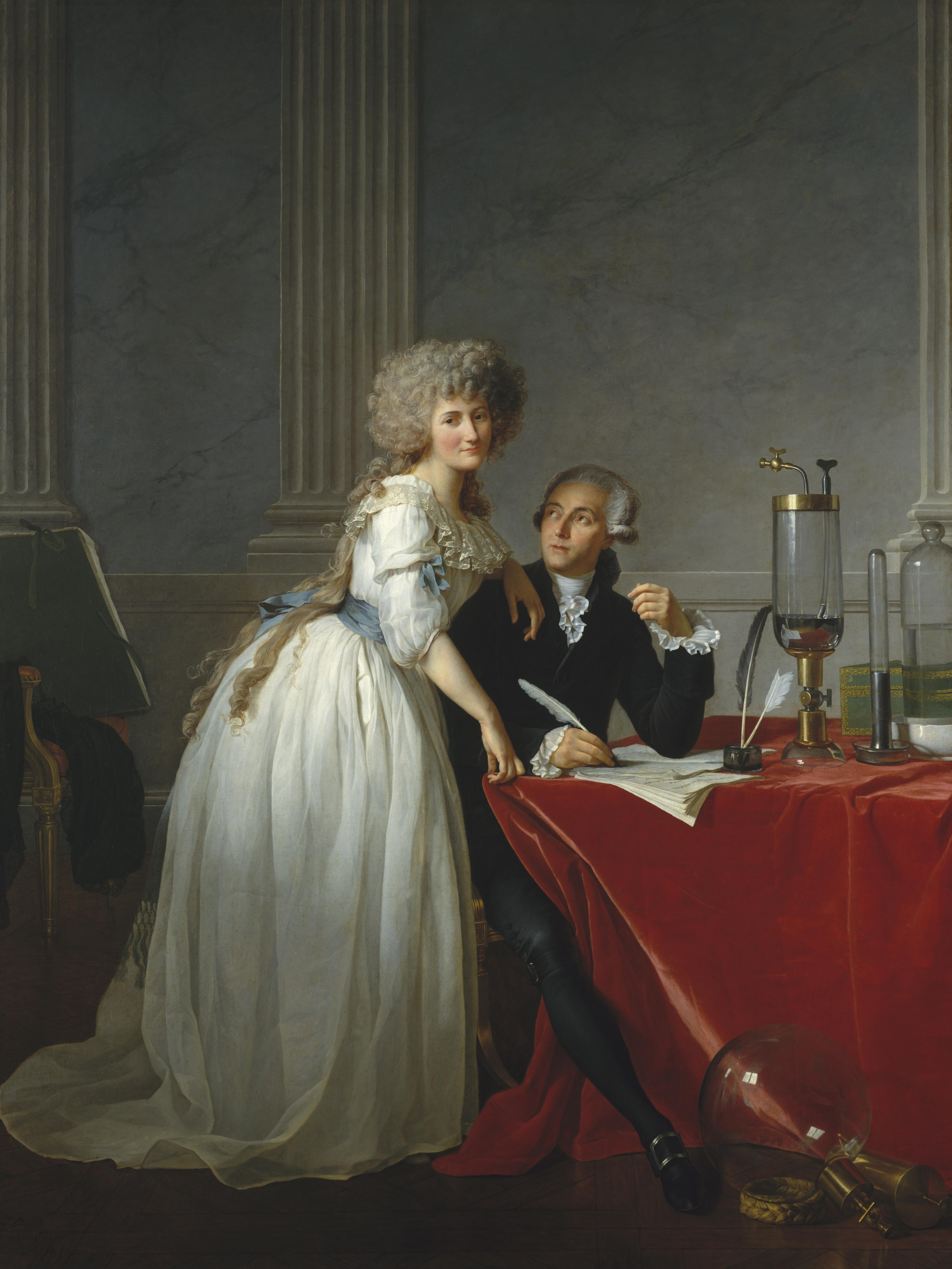
Portrait of M. and Mme Lavoisier, by Jacques-Louis David, 1788 (Metropolitan Museum)

Despite these limitations, there was support for women in the sciences among some men, and many made valuable contributions to science during the 18th century. Two notable women who managed to participate in formal institutions were Laura Bassi and the Russian Princess Yekaterina Dashkova. Bassi was an Italian physicist who received a PhD from the University of Bologna and began teaching there in 1732. Dashkova became the director of the Russian Imperial Academy of Sciences of St. Petersburg in 1783. Her personal relationship with Empress Catherine the Great (r. 1762–1796) allowed her to obtain the position, which marked in history the first appointment of a woman to the directorship of a scientific academy. Eva Ekeblad became the first woman inducted into the Royal Swedish Academy of Science (1748).

More commonly, women participated in the sciences through an association with a male relative or spouse. Caroline Herschel began her astronomical career, although somewhat reluctantly at first, by assisting her brother William Herschel. Caroline Herschel is most remembered for her discovery of eight comets and her Index to Flamsteed's Observations of the Fixed Stars (1798). On August 1, 1786, Herschel discovered her first comet, much to the excitement of scientifically minded women. Fanny Burney commented on the discovery, stating that "the comet was very small, and had nothing grand or striking in its appearance; but it is the first lady's comet, and I was very desirous to see it." Marie-Anne Pierette Paulze worked collaboratively with her husband, Antoine Lavoisier. Aside from assisting in Lavoisier's laboratory research, she was responsible for translating a number of English texts into French for her husband's work on the new chemistry. Paulze also illustrated many of her husband's publications, such as his Treatise on Chemistry (1789).

Many other women became illustrators or translators of scientific texts. In France, Madeleine Françoise Basseporte was employed by the Royal Botanical Garden as an illustrator. Englishwoman Mary Delany developed a unique method of illustration. Her technique involved using hundreds of pieces of coloured-paper to recreate lifelike renditions of living plants. German born Maria Sibylla Merian along with her daughters including Dorothea Maria Graff were involved in the careful scientific study of insects and the natural world. Using mostly watercolor, gauche on vellum, She became one of the leading entomologists of the 18th century. Maria Sibylla and her daughter Dorothea traveled to Suriname to study the different life stages of insects there and the plants on which they lived. On their return, Merian published in 1705 the lavishly illustrated Metamorphosis Surinamensis.

Noblewomen sometimes cultivated their own botanical gardens, including Mary Somerset and Margaret Harley. Scientific translation sometimes required more than a grasp on multiple languages. Besides translating Newton's Principia into French, Émilie du Châtelet expanded Newton's work to include recent progress made in mathematical physics after his death.

== Disciplines ==
=== Astronomy ===
Building on the body of work forwarded by Copernicus, Kepler and Newton, 18th-century astronomers refined telescopes, produced star catalogues, and worked towards explaining the motions of heavenly bodies and the consequences of universal gravitation. Among the prominent astronomers of the age was Edmund Halley. In 1705, Halley correctly linked historical descriptions of particularly bright comets to the reappearance of just one, which would later be named Halley's Comet, based on his computation of the orbits of comets. Halley also changed the theory of the Newtonian universe, which described the fixed stars. When he compared the ancient positions of stars to their contemporary positions, he found that they had shifted. James Bradley, while attempting to document stellar parallax, realized that the unexplained motion of stars he had early observed with Samuel Molyneux was caused by the aberration of light. The discovery was proof of a heliocentric model of the universe, since it is the revolution of the earth around the sun that causes an apparent motion in the observed position of a star. The discovery also led Bradley to a fairly close estimate to the speed of light.

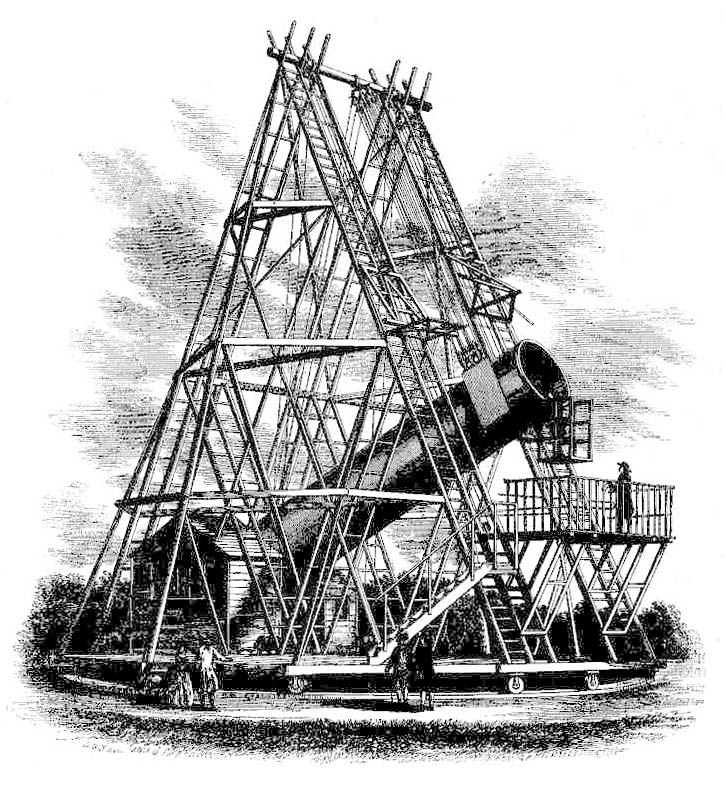
William Herschel's 40 foot (12 m) telescope

Observations of Venus in the 18th century became an important step in describing atmospheres. During the 1761 transit of Venus, the Russian scientist Mikhail Lomonosov observed a ring of light around the planet. Lomonosov attributed the ring to the refraction of sunlight, which he correctly hypothesized was caused by the atmosphere of Venus. Further evidence of Venus' atmosphere was gathered in observations by Johann Hieronymus Schröter in 1779. The planet also offered Alexis Claude de Clairaut an opportunity to work his considerable mathematical skills when he computed the mass of Venus through complex mathematical calculations.

However, much astronomical work of the period becomes shadowed by one of the most dramatic scientific discoveries of the 18th century. On 13 March 1781, amateur astronomer William Herschel spotted a new planet with his powerful reflecting telescope. Initially identified as a comet, the celestial body later came to be accepted as a planet. Soon after, the planet was named Georgium Sidus by Herschel and was called Herschelium in France. The name Uranus, as proposed by Johann Bode, came into widespread usage after Herschel's death. On the theoretical side of astronomy, the English natural philosopher John Michell first proposed the existence of dark stars in 1783. Michell postulated that if the density of a stellar object became great enough, its attractive force would become so large that even light could not escape. He also surmised that the location of a dark star could be determined by the strong gravitational force it would exert on surrounding stars. While differing somewhat from a black hole, the dark star can be understood as a predecessor to the black holes resulting from Albert Einstein's general theory of relativity.

=== Chemistry ===
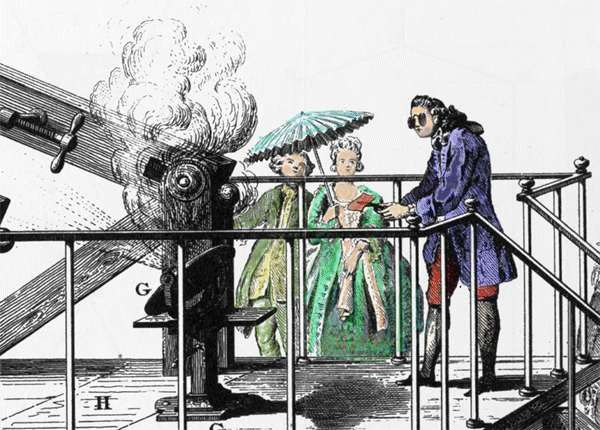
Antoine Lavoisier conducting an experiment related to combustion generated by amplified sun light

The chemical revolution was a period in the 18th century marked by significant advancements in the theory and practice of chemistry. Despite the maturity of most of the sciences during the scientific revolution, by the mid-18th century chemistry had yet to outline a systematic framework or theoretical doctrine. Elements of alchemy still permeated the study of chemistry, and the belief that the natural world was composed of the classical elements of earth, water, air and fire remained prevalent. The key achievement of the chemical revolution has traditionally been viewed as the abandonment of phlogiston theory in favour of Antoine Lavoisier's oxygen theory of combustion; however, more recent studies attribute a wider range of factors as contributing forces behind the chemical revolution.

Developed under Johann Joachim Becher and Georg Ernst Stahl, phlogiston theory was an attempt to account for products of combustion. According to the theory, a substance called phlogiston was released from flammable materials through burning. The resulting product was termed calx, which was considered a 'dephlogisticated' substance in its 'true' form. The first strong evidence against phlogiston theory came from pneumatic chemists in Britain during the later half of the 18th century. Joseph Black, Joseph Priestley and Henry Cavendish all identified different gases that composed air; however, it was not until Antoine Lavoisier discovered in the fall of 1772 that, when burned, sulphur and phosphorus "gain[ed] in weight" that the phlogiston theory began to unravel.

Lavoisier subsequently discovered and named oxygen, described its role in animal respiration and the calcination of metals exposed to air (1774–1778). In 1783, Lavoisier found that water was a compound of oxygen and hydrogen. Lavoisier's years of experimentation formed a body of work that contested phlogiston theory. After reading his "Reflections on Phlogiston" to the Academy in 1785, chemists began dividing into camps based on the old phlogiston theory and the new oxygen theory. A new form of chemical nomenclature, developed by Louis Bernard Guyton de Morveau, with assistance from Lavoisier, classified elements binomially into a genus and a species. For example, burned lead was of the genus oxide and species lead. Transition to and acceptance of Lavoisier's new chemistry varied in pace across Europe. The new chemistry was established in Glasgow and Edinburgh early in the 1790s, but was slow to become established in Germany. Eventually the oxygen-based theory of combustion drowned out the phlogiston theory and in the process created the basis of modern chemistry.

== See also ==
- Scientific method
- Rationalism
