= Pierre Polinière =

French physicist

Pierre Polinière (8 September 1671 – 9 February 1734) was an early investigator of electricity and electrical phenomena, notably "barometric light", a form of gas-discharge light, which suggested the possibility of electric lighting. He also helped to introduce the scientific method in French universities.

== Biography ==
Pierre Polinière was born in Coulonces, Province of Normandy. He was the only child of Jean-Baptiste Poulynière and Françoise Vasnier. Pierre's father had inherited an estate in Coulonces in lower Normandy. However, when Pierre was 3 years old, his father died. Fortunately his mother recognized his potential and strove to get him a good education. After receiving a classical education at the University of Caen Normandy, two of his paternal uncles, who were Catholic clergymen, arranged to have him study philosophy at Harcourt College of the University of Paris. There he also studied mathematics under Pierre Varignon (1654–1722), an early advocate of calculus. In the 1690s Poliniere received a degree in medicine; he also became interested in science. He did original research, including studies of the production of light by electrical discharges through low-pressure air, in which field he made discoveries that were simultaneous with, but independent of, those of the Englishman Francis Hauksbee (1666–1713). His discovery that static electricity could generate light in low-pressure gases led him to speculate that lightning was a form of static electric discharge.

He also presented public lectures on science, which included experimental demonstrations of his own devising. Around 1700, he presented these demonstrations before students at the colleges of the University of Paris. His lectures proved very popular: in 1722, he presented a series of experiments before the young King of France, Louis XV. In 1709, he published Expériences de Physique (Physics Experiments), a book presenting his demonstrations on magnetism, light and colors, hydrostatics, the properties of air, and other subjects. The book went through five editions. He was an early French advocate of Isaac Newton's findings in optics: in the second (and subsequent) editions of his Expériences, he abandoned the then current theory of color and instead advocated Newton’s theory that white light was a mixture of lights of various colors.

At age 36 Poliniere married Marguerite Asselin, whose brother was principal of Harcourt College. The couple had two sons (Julien-Pierre and Daniel) and two daughters (Jeanne and Marie).

Perhaps his most important achievement was aiding the adoption of the scientific method in France. Among France's university professors, the belief prevailed that understanding of nature could be reached with certainty only by deductive logic since induction from experiment could not provide certainty; therefore, experiments merely served to confirm the conclusions of reasoned arguments about nature. Polinière abandoned this method, arguing that truths about nature could be reached only by experiment. He died in his birth town of Coulonces in 1734.
