= Barometric light =

Light emitted by mercury filled barometer

Barometric light is a name for the light that is emitted by a mercury-filled barometer tube when the tube is shaken. The discovery of this phenomenon in 1675 revealed the possibility of electric lighting.

== The phenomenon and its explanation ==
The earliest barometers were simply glass tubes that were closed at one end and filled with mercury. The tube was then inverted and its open end was submerged in a cup of mercury. The mercury then drained out of the tube until the pressure of the mercury in the tube—as measured at the surface of the mercury in the cup—equaled the atmosphere's pressure on the same surface.

In order to produce barometric light, the glass tube must be very clean and the mercury must be pure. If the barometer is then shaken, a band of light will appear on the glass at the meniscus of the mercury whenever the mercury moves downward.

When mercury contacts glass, the mercury transfers electrons to the glass. Whenever the mercury pulls free of the glass, these electrons are released from the glass into the surroundings, where they collide with gas molecules, causing the gas to glow—just as the collision of electrons and neon atoms causes a neon lamp to glow.

== History ==
Barometric light was first observed in 1675 by the French astronomer Jean Picard: "Towards the year 1676, Monsieur Picard was transporting his barometer from the Observatory to Port Saint Michel during the night, [when] he noticed a light in a part of the tube where the mercury was moving; this phenomenon having surprised him, he immediately reported it to the sçavans, ... " The Swiss mathematician Johann Bernoulli studied the phenomenon while teaching at Groningen, the Netherlands, and in 1700 he demonstrated the phenomenon to the French Academy. After learning of the phenomenon from Bernoulli, the Englishman Francis Hauksbee investigated the subject extensively. Hauksbee showed that a complete vacuum was not essential to the phenomenon, for the same glow was apparent when mercury was shaken with air only partially rarefied, and that even without using the barometric tube, bulbs containing low-pressure gases could be made to glow via externally applied static electricity. The phenomenon was also studied by contemporaries of Hauksbee, including the Frenchman Pierre Polinière and a French mathematician, Gabriel-Philippe de la Hire, and subsequently by many others.
