= Francis Hauksbee =

English scientist (1660–1713)

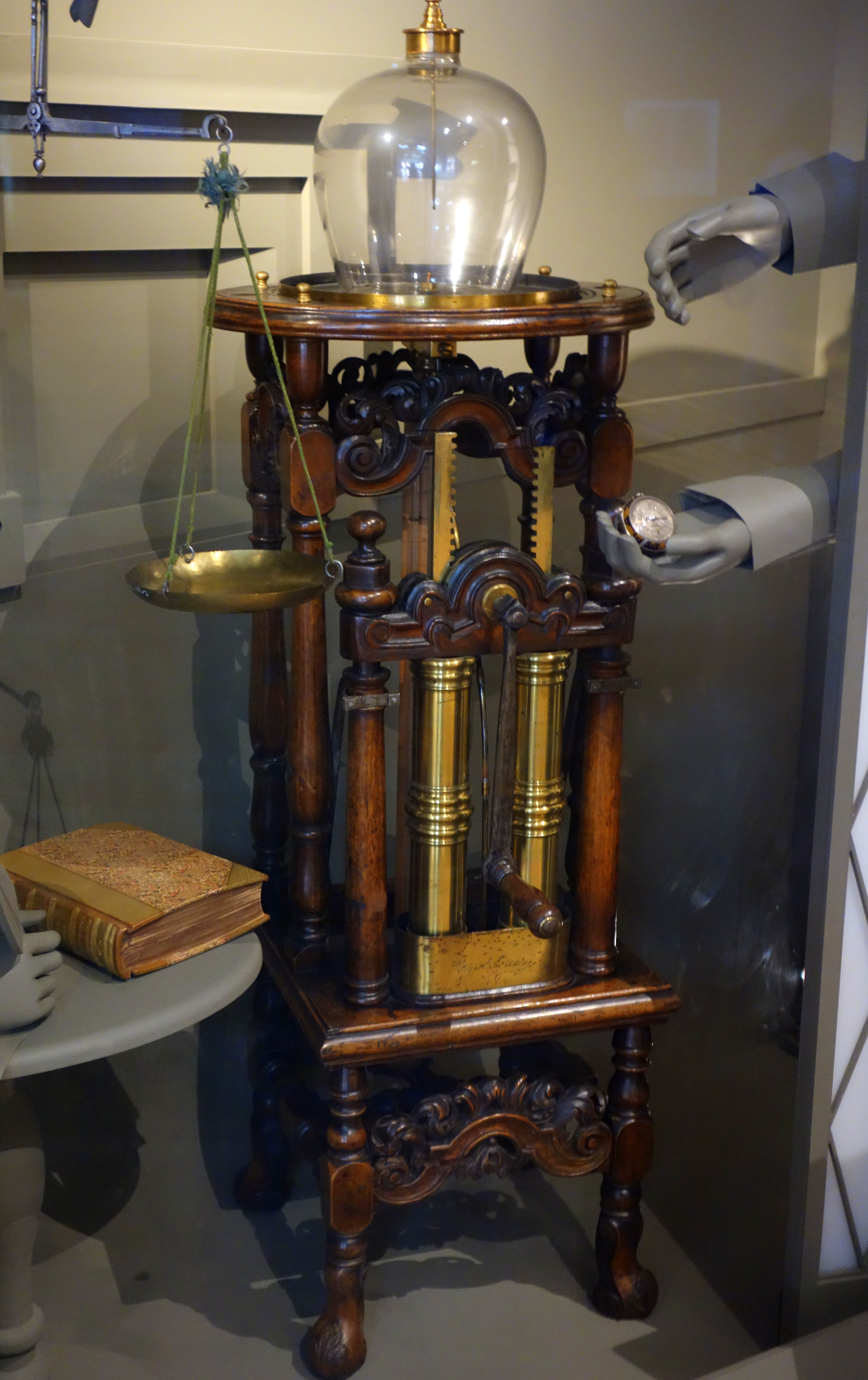
- Air pump made by Francis Hauksbee, 1708-1709
- Born: 1660
- Died: 29 April 1713 (aged 52–53); London, England
- Occupation: Scientist
- Known for: Work on electricity and electrostatic repulsion

Francis Hauksbee the Elder FRS (1660–1713), also known as Francis Hawksbee, was an 18th-century English scientist best known for his work on electricity and electrostatic repulsion.

== Biography ==
Francis Hauksbee was the son of draper and common councillor Richard Hauksbee and his wife Mary. He was baptized on 27 May 1660 in the parish of St Mary-at-the-Walls, Colchester. He was the fifth of five sons. In 1673 Hauksbee entered Colchester Royal Grammar School. From 1678 to at least 1685 he apprenticed as a draper in the City of London, initially to his eldest brother. He was married no later than May 1687, when a daughter was born. Five of his eight children survived infancy. From 1687 to 1703, he may have run his own drapery shop. From at least March 1701, he lived at Giltspur Street, where he made air-pumps and pneumatic engines.

The transition from drapery to scientific instrumentation and experimentation is not well documented. Historians have had to speculate about the events that lead to Hauksbee engagement with the Royal Society. Hauksbee became Isaac Newton's lab assistant. He became a member of the Royal Society on 30 November 1703. On 15 December 1703, he made his first experimental demonstration to the Society (a new air-pump and the phenomenon of ‘mercurial phosphorus,’ a kind of electrostatic discharge). This was also the first meeting chaired by Isaac Newton, who had just become president of the Society, and wished to resurrect the Royal Society's weekly demonstrations.

Hauksbee was an instrument maker and appointed as chief experimentalist of the Royal Society. He was never formally appointed as Curator of experiments, even though he fulfilled the functions customarily associated with that office, and he never received a fixed salary. He was elected a Fellow of the Royal Society on 30 November 1705, with lowest social class status among the previously elected Fellows.

By 1709 Hauksbee had established himself at Wine Office Court, and by 1712 at Hind Court, both near Fleet Street and the Royal Society's house at Crane Court. He died at Hind Court and was buried in St Dunstan's-in-the-West, London on 29 April 1713. John Theophilus Desaguliers succeeded Hauksbee at the Royal Society, appointed as Demonstrator and Curator in 1714, by invitation from Isaac Newton, who was still President.

== Scientific contributions ==
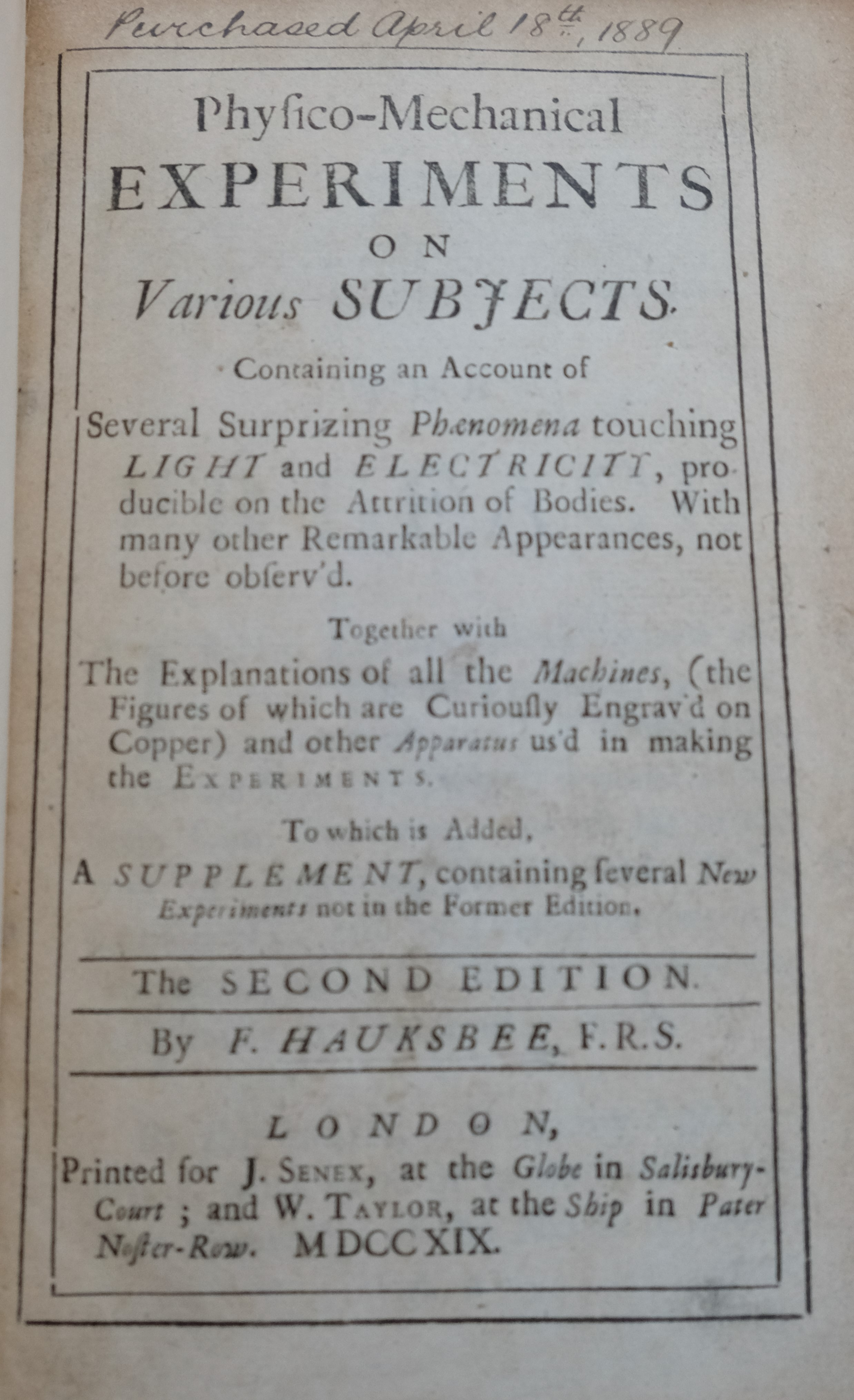
Title page of a 1719 copy of Hauksbee's Physico-Mechanical Experiments on Various Subjects

Hauksbee's primary contributions were that he was a talented scientific instrument-maker and a creative experimenter, who was able to discover unknown and unexpected phenomena, especially his observations about electrical attraction and repulsion.

Until 1705, most of these experiments were air pump experiments of a mundane nature, but Hauksbee then turned to investigating the luminosity of mercury which was known to emit a glow under barometric vacuum conditions, a phenomenon known as barometric light.

He was the first to observe, in the early 1700s, that it was possible to use glass for electrical experiments.

By 1705, Hauksbee had discovered that if he placed a small amount of mercury in the glass of his modified version of Otto von Guericke's generator, evacuated the air from it to create a mild vacuum and rubbed the ball in order to build up a charge, a glow was visible if he placed his hand on the outside of the ball. This remarkable discovery was unprecedented at the time. This glow was bright enough to read by. It seemed to be similar to St. Elmo's fire. This effect later became the basis of the gas-discharge lamp, which led to neon lighting and mercury vapor lamps. In 1706 he produced a machine to generate this effect.

Hauksbee continued to experiment with electricity, making numerous observations and developing machines to generate and demonstrate various electrical phenomena.

In 1708, Hauksbee independently discovered Charles's law of gases, which states that, for a given mass of gas at a constant pressure, the volume of the gas is proportional to its temperature.

== Publications ==
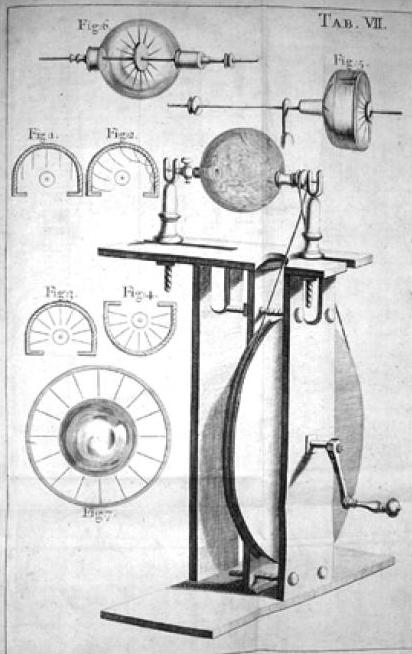
Generator built by Francis Hauksbee. From Physico-Mechanical Experiments, 2nd Ed., London 1719

Hauksbee published accounts of his experiments in the Royal Society's journal Philosophical Transactions. In 1709 he self-published Physico-Mechanical Experiments on Various Subjects which collected together many of these experiments along with discussion that summarized much of his scientific work. An Italian translation was published in 1716. A second edition was published posthumously in 1719. There were also translations to Dutch (1735) and French (1754).

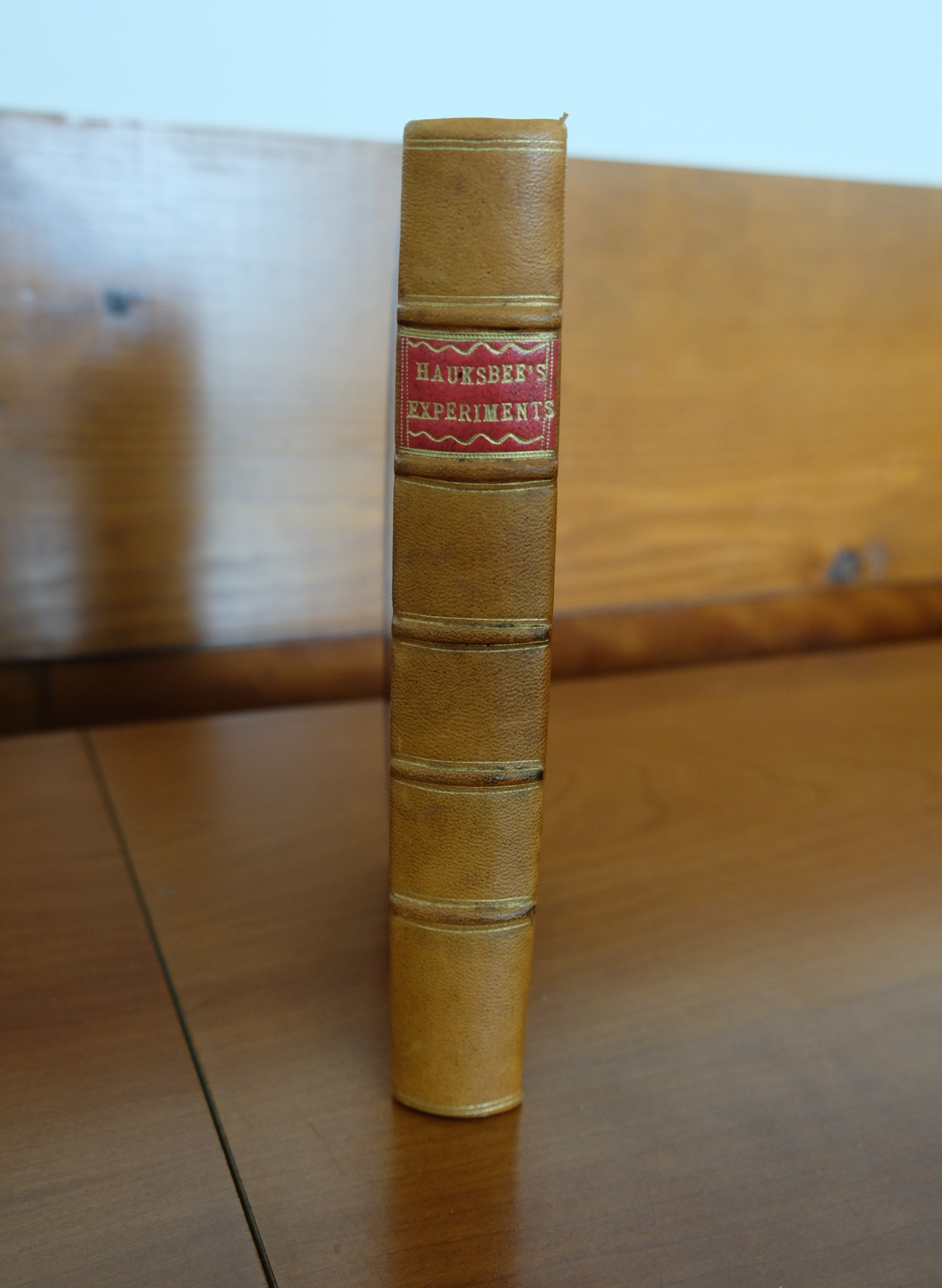
1719 copy of "Physico-Mechanical Experiments on Various Subjects"

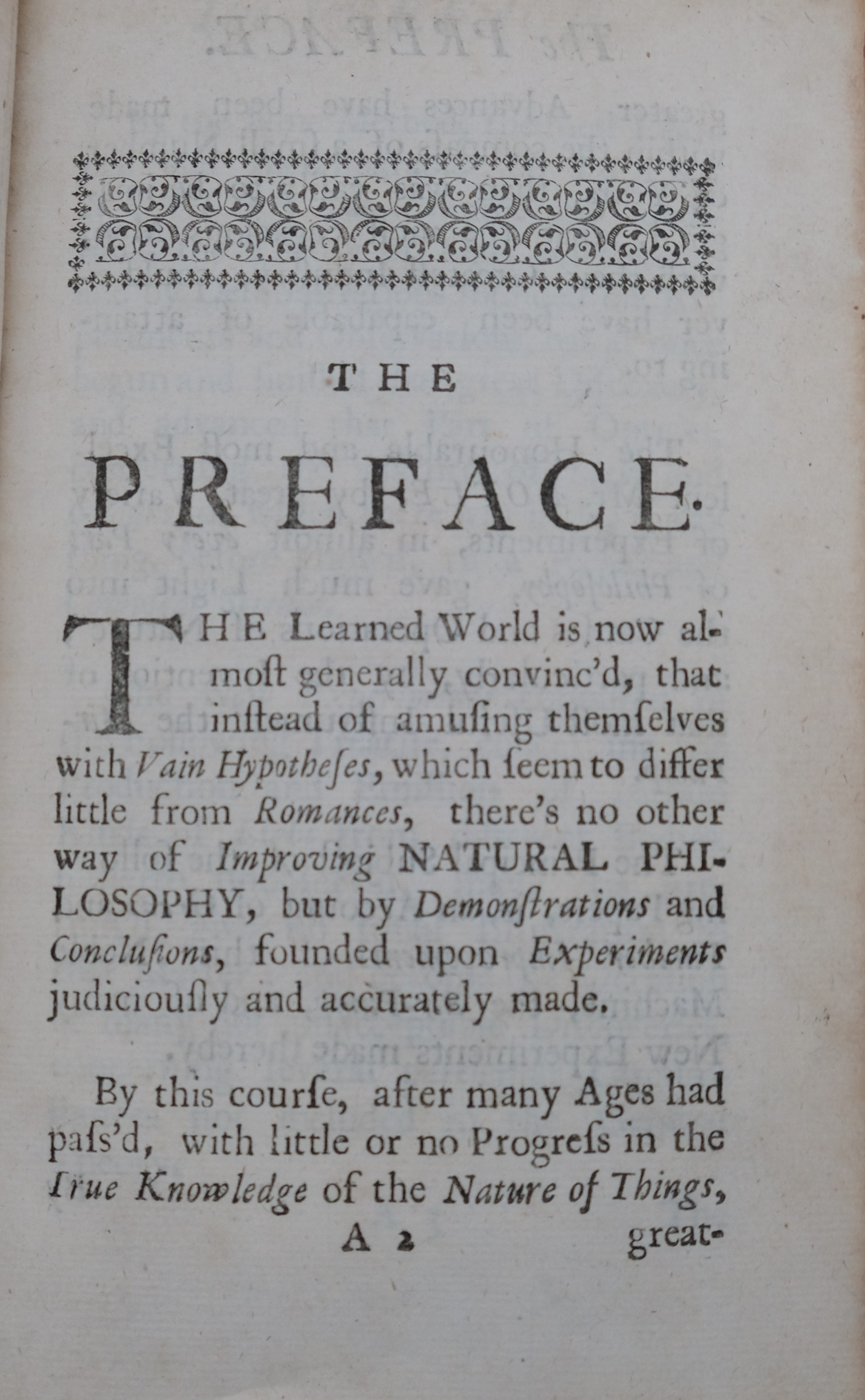
Preface to "Physico-Mechanical Experiments on Various Subjects"

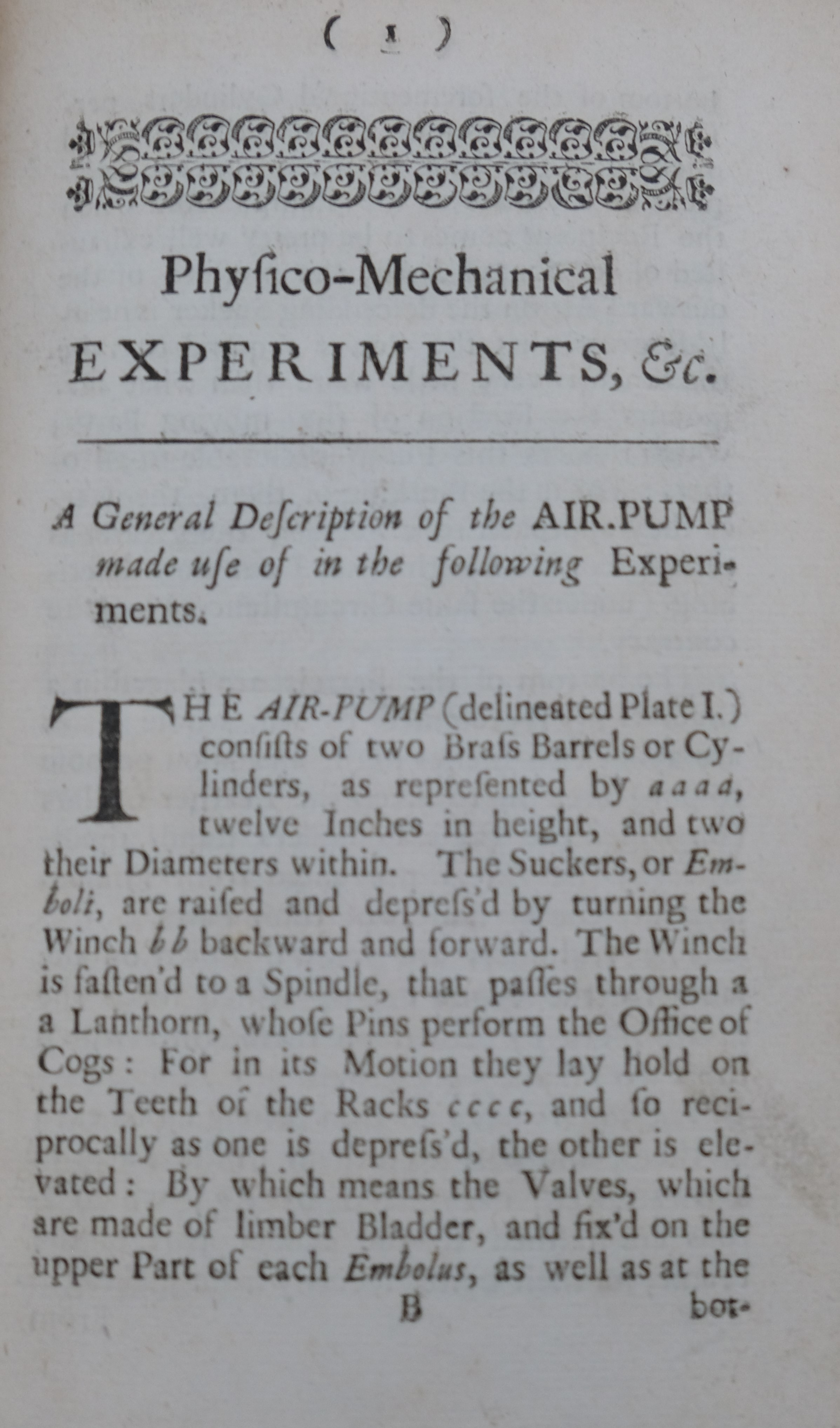
First page of "Physico-Mechanical Experiments on Various Subjects"

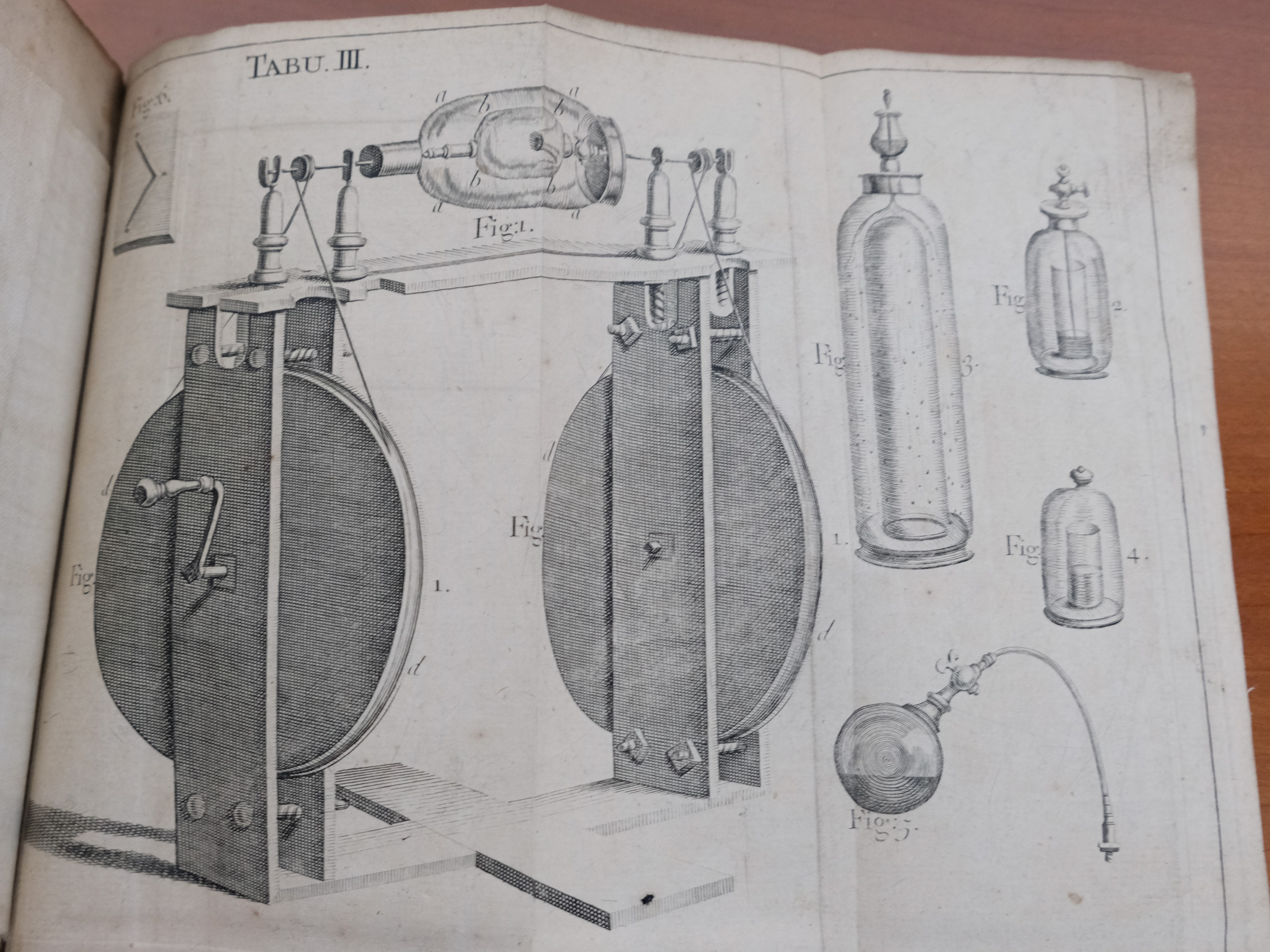
Figures in "Physico-Mechanical Experiments on Various Subjects"

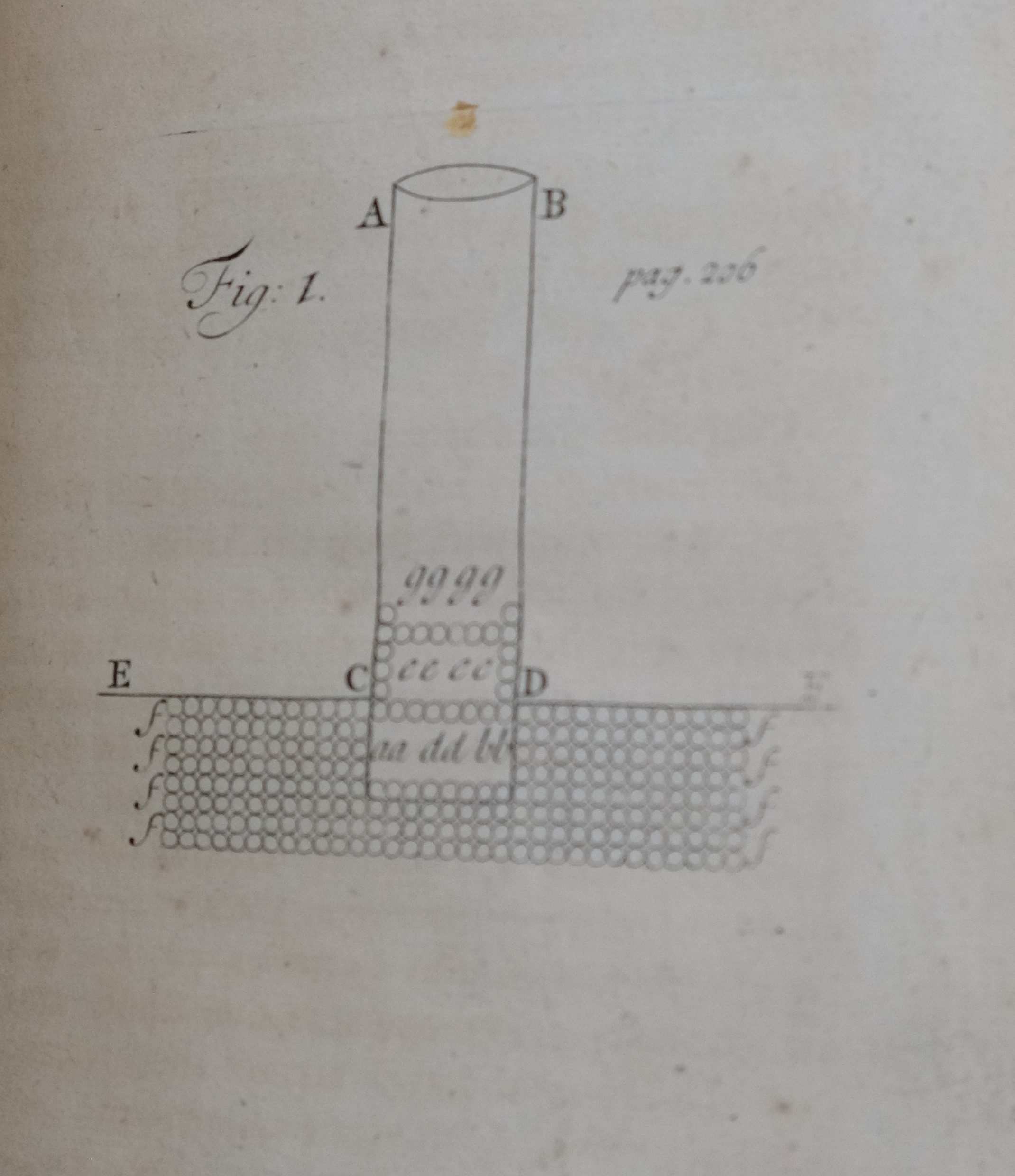
Figure in "Physico-Mechanical Experiments on Various Subjects"

== Hauksbee Awards ==
The Royal Society Hauksbee Awards, awarded in 2010, were given by the Royal Society to the “unsung heroes of science, technology, engineering and mathematics.”

The awards were established as an annual award starting in 2022, to be awarded to individuals or teams whose work is mostly in support and not otherwise recognised.
